This is an incomplete list of standards published by the International Electrotechnical Commission (IEC).

The numbers of older IEC standards were converted in 1997 by adding 60000; for example IEC 27 became IEC 60027.
IEC standards often have multiple sub-part documents; only the main title for the standard is listed here.

 IEC 60027 Letter symbols to be used in electrical technology
 IEC 60028 International standard of resistance for copper
 IEC 60034 Rotating electrical machines
 IEC 60038 IEC Standard Voltages
 IEC 60041 Field acceptance tests to determine the hydraulic performance of hydraulic turbines, storage pumps and pump-turbines
 IEC 60044 Instrument transformers
 IEC 60045 Steam turbines 
 IEC 60050 International Electrotechnical Vocabulary
 IEC 60051 Direct acting indicating analogue electrical measuring instruments and their accessories
 IEC 60052 Voltage measurement by means of standard air gaps
 IEC 60055 Paper-insulated metal-sheathed cables for rated voltages up to 18/30 kV (with copper or aluminium conductors and excluding gas-pressure and oil-filled cables)
 IEC 60059 IEC standard current ratings 
 IEC 60060 High-voltage test techniques
 IEC 60061 Lamp caps and holders together with gauges for the control of interchangeability and safety 
 IEC 60062 Marking codes for resistors and capacitors
 IEC 60063 Preferred number series for resistors and capacitors
 IEC 60064 Tungsten filament lamps for domestic and similar general lighting purposes – Performance requirements
 IEC 60065 Audio, video and similar electronic apparatus – Safety requirements
 IEC 60067 Dimensions of electronic tubes and valves
 IEC 60068 Environmental testing
 IEC 60071 Insulation co-ordination
 IEC 60072 Dimensions and output series for rotating electrical machines
 IEC 60073 Basic and safety principles for man-machine interface, marking and identification – Coding principles for indicators and actuators
 IEC 60076 Power transformers
 IEC 60077 Railway applications – Electric equipment for rolling stock
 IEC 60079 Explosive atmospheres
 IEC 60081 Double-capped fluorescent lamps – Performance specifications
 IEC 60083 Plugs and socket-outlets for domestic and similar general use standardized in member countries of IEC
 IEC 60085 Electrical insulation – Thermal evaluation and designation
 IEC 60086 Primary batteries;  
 IEC 60092 Electrical installations in ships
 IEC 60094 Magnetic tape sound recording and reproducing systems
 IEC 60095 Lead-acid starter batteries
 IEC 60096 Radio frequency cables
 IEC 60098 Rumble measurement on Vinyl Disc Turntables
 IEC 60099 Surge arresters
 IEC 60100 Methods for the measurement of direct inter-electrode capacitance of electronic tubes and valves
 IEC 60104 Aluminium-magnesium-silicon alloy wire for overhead line conductors
 IEC 60105 Recommendation for commercial-purity aluminium busbar material
 IEC 60107 Methods of measurement on receivers for television broadcast transmissions
 IEC 60110 Power capacitors for induction heating installations
 IEC 60112 Method for the determination of the proof and the comparative tracking indices of solid insulating materials
 IEC 60114 Recommendation for heat-treated aluminium alloy busbar material of the aluminium-magnesium-silicon type
 IEC 60115 Fixed resistors for use in electronic equipment
 IEC 60118 Electroacoustics – Hearing aids
 IEC 60119 The Electrical Performance of Semiconductor Rectifiers (Metal Rectifiers) (Withdrawn)
 IEC 60120 Dimensions of ball and socket couplings of string insulator units
 IEC 60121 Recommendation for commercial annealed aluminium electrical conductor wire
 IEC 60122 Quartz crystal units of assessed quality
 IEC 60127 Miniature fuses
 IEC 60130 Connectors for frequencies below 3 MHz
 IEC 60134 Rating systems for electronic tubes and valves and analogous semiconductor devices
 IEC 60135 Numbering of electrodes and designation of units in electronic tubes and valves
 IEC 60136 Dimensions of brushes and brush-holders for electrical machinery
 IEC 60137 Insulated bushings for alternating voltages above 1000 V
 IEC 60139 Preparation of outline drawings for cathode-ray tubes, their components, connections and gauges
 IEC 60141 Tests on oil-filled and gas-pressure cables and their accessories
 IEC 60143 Series capacitors for power systems
 IEC 60146 Semiconductor converters – General requirements and line commutated converters
 IEC 60151 Measurements of the electrical properties of electronic tubes and valves
 IEC 60152 Identification by hour numbers of the phase conductors of 3-phase electric systems
 IEC 60153 Hollow metallic waveguides
 IEC 60154 Flanges for waveguides
 IEC 60155 Glow-starters for fluorescent lamps
 IEC 60156 Insulating liquids – Determination of the breakdown voltage at power frequency
 IEC 60168 Tests on indoor and outdoor post insulators of ceramic material or glass for systems with nominal voltages greater than 1000 V
 IEC 60169 Radio frequency connectors
 IEC 60172 Test procedure for the determination of the temperature index of enamelled and tape wrapped winding wires
 IEC 60183 Guidance for the selection of high-voltage A.C. cable systems
 IEC 60188 High-pressure mercury vapour lamps – Performance specifications
 IEC 60189 Low-frequency cables and wires with PVC insulation and PVC sheath
 IEC 60191 Mechanical standardization of semiconductor devices
 IEC 60192 Low-pressure sodium vapour lamps – Performance specifications
 IEC 60193 Hydraulic turbines, storage pumps and pump-turbines – Model acceptance tests
 IEC 60194 Printed board design, manufacture and assembly – Terms and definitions
 IEC 60195 Method of measurement of current noise generated in fixed resistors
 IEC 60196 IEC standard frequencies
 IEC 60197 High-voltage connecting wire with flame retarding insulation for use in television receivers
 IEC 60204 Safety of machinery – Electrical equipment of machines
 IEC 60205 Calculation of the effective parameters of magnetic piece parts
 IEC 60211 Maximum demand indicators, Class 1.0
 IEC 60212 Standard conditions for use prior to and during the testing of solid electrical insulating materials
 IEC 60214 Tap-changers
 IEC 60215 Safety requirements for radio transmitting equipment
 IEC 60216 Electrical insulating materials – Thermal endurance properties
 IEC 60227 Polyvinyl chloride insulated cables of rated voltages up to and including 450/750 V
 IEC 60228 Conductors of insulated cables
 IEC 60229 Electric cables – Tests on extruded over-sheaths with a special protective function
 IEC 60230 Impulse tests on cables and their accessories
 IEC 60231 General principles of nuclear reactor instrumentation
 IEC 60233 Tests on Hollow Insulators for use in Electrical Equipment (Withdrawn)
 IEC 60235 Measurement of the electrical properties of microwave tubes
 IEC 60236 Methods for the designation of electrostatic deflecting electrodes of cathode-ray tubes
 IEC 60238 Edison screw lampholders
 IEC 60239 Graphite electrodes for electric arc furnaces – Dimensions and designation
 IEC 60240 Characteristics of electric infra-red emitters for industrial heating
 IEC 60243 Electric strength of insulating materials
 IEC 60244 Methods of measurement for radio transmitters
 IEC 60245 Rubber insulated cables – Rated voltages up to and including 450/750 V
 IEC 60246 Connecting wires having a rated voltage of 20 kV and 25 kV d.c. and a maximum working temperature of 105 °C for use in television receivers
 IEC 60247 Insulating liquids – Measurement of relative permittivity, dielectric dissipation factor (tan d) and d.c. resistivity
 IEC 60250 Recommended methods for the determination of the permittivity and dielectric dissipation factor of electrical insulating materials at power, audio and radio frequencies including metre wavelengths
 IEC 60252 AC motor capacitors
 IEC 60254 Lead-acid traction batteries
 IEC 60255 Measuring relays and protection equipment
 IEC 60258 Direct acting recording electrical measuring instruments and their accessories
 IEC 60261 Sealing test for pressurized waveguide tubing and assemblies
 IEC 60263 Scales and sizes for plotting frequency characteristics and polar diagrams
 IEC 60264 Packaging of winding wires
 IEC 60268 Sound system equipment
 IEC 60269 Low-voltage fuses
 IEC 60270 High-voltage test techniques – Partial discharge measurements
 IEC 60273 Characteristic of indoor and outdoor post insulators for systems with nominal voltages greater than 1000 V
 IEC 60276 Definitions and nomenclature for carbon brushes, brush-holders, commutators and slip-rings
 IEC 60282 High-voltage fuses
 IEC 60286 Packaging of components for automatic handling
 IEC 60287 Electric cables – Calculation of the current rating
 IEC 60294 Measurement of the dimensions of a cylindrical component with axial terminations 
 IEC 60296 Fluids for electrotechnical applications – Unused mineral insulating oils for transformers and switchgear
 IEC 60297 Mechanical structures for electronic equipment – Dimensions of mechanical structures of the 482,6 mm (19 in) series
 IEC 60298 high voltage switchgear in metallic enclosure (Withdrawn)
 IEC 60299 Household electric blankets – Methods for measuring performance
 IEC 60300 Dependability management
 IEC 60301 Preferred diameters of wire terminations of capacitors and resistors
 IEC 60304 Standard colours for insulation for low-frequency cables and wires
 IEC 60305 Insulators for overhead lines with a nominal voltage above 1000 V – Ceramic or glass insulator units for a.c. systems – Characteristics of insulator units of the cap and pin type
 IEC 60306 Measurement of photosensitive devices
 IEC 60308 Hydraulic turbines – Testing of control systems
 IEC 60309 Plugs, socket-outlets and couplers for industrial purposes
 IEC 60310 Railway applications – Traction transformers and inductors on board rolling stock
 IEC 60311 Electric irons for household or similar use – Methods for measuring performance
 IEC 60315 Methods of measurement on radio receivers for various classes of emission
 IEC 60317 Specifications for particular types of winding wires
 IEC 60318 Electroacoustics – Simulators of human head and ear
 IEC 60319 Presentation and specification of reliability data for electronic components
 IEC 60320 Appliance couplers for household and similar general purposes
 IEC 60322 Railway applications – Electric equipment for rolling stock – Rules for power resistors of open construction
 IEC 60325 Radiation protection instrumentation – Alpha, beta and alpha/beta (beta energy >60 keV) contamination meters and monitors
 IEC 60329 Strip-wound cut cores of grain oriented silicon-iron alloy, used for electronic and telecommunication equipment
 IEC 60331 Tests for electric cables under fire conditions – Circuit integrity
 IEC 60332 Tests on electric and optical fibre cables under fire conditions
 IEC 60335 Household and similar electrical appliances – Safety
 IEC 60336 Medical electrical equipment – X-ray tube assemblies for medical diagnosis – Characteristics of focal spots
 IEC 60338 Telemetering for consumption and demand
 IEC 60339 General purpose rigid coaxial transmission lines and their associated flange connectors
 IEC 60343 Recommended test methods for determining the relative resistance of insulating materials to breakdown by surface discharges
 IEC TR 60344 Calculation of d.c. resistance of plain and coated copper conductors of low-frequency cables and wires – Application guide
 IEC 60345 Method of test for electrical resistance and resistivity of insulating materials at elevated temperatures
 IEC 60347 Transverse track recorders
 IEC 60349 Electric traction – Rotating electrical machines for rail and road vehicles
 IEC 60350 Household electric cooking appliances
 IEC 60352 Solderless connections
 IEC 60353 Line traps for a.c. power systems
 IEC 60356 Dimensions for commutators and slip-rings
 IEC 60357 Tungsten halogen lamps (non vehicle) – Performance specifications
 IEC 60358 Coupling capacitors and capacitor dividers
 IEC 60360 Standard method of measurement of lamp cap temperature rise
 IEC 60364 Low-voltage electrical installations
 IEC 60368 Piezoelectric filters of assessed quality
 IEC 60370 Test procedure for thermal endurance of insulating varnishes – Electric strength method
 IEC 60371 Specification for insulating materials based on mica
 IEC 60372 Locking devices for ball and socket couplings of string insulator units – Dimensions and tests
 IEC 60374 Guide for choosing modular dimensions for waveguide components
 IEC 60375 Conventions concerning electric and magnetic circuits
 IEC 60376 Specification of technical grade sulfur hexafluoride (SF6) for use in electrical equipment
 IEC 60377 Methods for the determination of the dielectric properties of insulating materials at frequencies above 300 MHz
 IEC 60379 Methods for measuring the performance of electric storage water-heaters for household purposes
 IEC 60381 Analogue signals for process control systems
 IEC 60382 Analogue pneumatic signal for process control systems
 IEC 60383 Insulators for overhead lines with a nominal voltage above 1000 V
 IEC 60384 Fixed capacitors for use in electronic equipment
 IEC 60386 Method of measurement of speed fluctuations in sound recording and reproducing equipment
 IEC 60392 Guide for the drafting of specifications for microwave ferrites
 IEC 60393 Potentiometers for use in electronic equipment
 IEC 60394 Varnished fabrics for electrical purposes
 IEC 60397 Test methods for batch furnaces with metallic heating resistors
 IEC 60398 Installations for electroheating and electromagnetic processing – General performance test methods
 IEC 60399 Barrel thread for lampholders with shade holder ring
 IEC 60400 Lampholders for tubular fluorescent lamps and starter holders
 IEC 60401 Terms and nomenclature for cores made of magnetically soft ferrites
 IEC 60404 Magnetic materials
 IEC 60412 Nuclear instrumentation – Nomenclature (identification) of scintillators and scintillation detectors and standard dimensions of scintillators
 IEC 60413 Test procedures for determining physical properties of brush materials for electrical machines
 IEC 60417 Graphical symbols for use on equipment
 IEC 60422 Mineral insulating oils in electrical equipment – Supervision and maintenance guidance
 IEC 60423 Conduit systems for cable management – Outside diameters of conduits for electrical installations and threads for conduits and fittings
 IEC 60424 Ferrite cores – Guidelines on the limits of surface irregularities
 IEC 60426 Electrical insulating materials – Determination of electrolytic corrosion caused by insulating materials – Test methods
 IEC 60428 Standard cells
 IEC 60432 Incandescent lamps – Safety specifications
 IEC 60433 Insulators for overhead lines with a nominal voltage above 1 000 V – Ceramic insulators for a.c. systems – Characteristics of insulator units of the long rod type
 IEC 60434 Aircraft electrical filament lamps
 IEC 60436 Electric dishwashers for household use – Methods for measuring the performance
 IEC 60437 Radio interference test on high-voltage insulators
 IEC 60439 Low voltage switchgear and control gear assemblies (Withdrawn)
 IEC 60440 Method of measurement of non-linearity in resistors
 IEC 60441 Photometric and colorimetric methods of measurement of the light emitted by a cathode-ray tube screen
 IEC 60442 Electric toasters for household and similar purposes – Methods for measuring the performance
 IEC 60444 Measurement of quartz crystal unit parameters by zero phase technique in a pi-network
 IEC 60445 Basic and safety principles for man-machine interface, marking and identification – Identification of equipment terminals, conductor terminations and conductors
 IEC 60446 Wiring colours (Withdrawn, replaced by IEC 60445:2010)
 IEC 60447 Basic and safety principles for man-machine interface, marking and identification – Actuating principles
 IEC 60450 Measurement of the average viscometric degree of polymerization of new and aged cellulosic electrically insulating materials
 IEC 60454 Specifications for pressure-sensitive adhesive tapes for electrical purposes
 IEC 60455 Resin based reactive compounds used for electrical insulation
 IEC 60456 Clothes washing machines for household use – Methods for measuring the performance
 IEC 60457 Rigid precision coaxial and their associated precision connectors
 IEC 60461 Time and control code
 IEC 60462 Nuclear instrumentation – Photomultiplier tubes for scintillation counting – Test procedures
 IEC 60464 Varnishes used for electrical insulation
 IEC 60465 Specification for unused insulating mineral oils for cables with oil ducts
 IEC 60468 Method of measurement of resistivity of metallic materials
 IEC 60469 Transitions, pulses and related waveforms – Terms, definitions and algorithms
 IEC 60471 Dimensions of clevis and tongue couplings of string insulator units
 IEC 60475 Method of sampling insulating liquids
 IEC 60477 Laboratory d.c. resistors
 IEC 60479 Effects of current on human beings and livestock
 IEC 60480 Guidelines for the checking and treatment of sulfur hexafluoride (SF6) taken from electrical equipment and specification for its re-use
 IEC 60481 Coupling devices for power line carrier systems
 IEC 60483 Guide to dynamic measurements of piezoelectric ceramics with high electromechanical coupling
 IEC 60487 Methods of measurement for equipment used in terrestrial radio-relay systems
 IEC 60488 Higher performance protocol for the standard digital interface for programmable instrumentation
 IEC 60489 Methods of measurement for radio equipment used in the mobile services
 IEC 60493 Guide for the statistical analysis of ageing test data
 IEC 60494 Railway applications – Rolling stock – Pantographs – Characteristics and tests
 IEC 60495 Single sideband power-line carrier terminals
 IEC 60496 Methods for measuring the performance of electric warming plates for household and similar purposes
 IEC 60498 High-voltage coaxial connectors used in nuclear instrumentation
 IEC 60499 Voltage limits for electronics to be considered "consumer grade" 
 IEC 60500 Underwater acoustics – Hydrophones – Properties of hydrophones in the frequency range 1 Hz to 500 kHz
 IEC 60502 Power cables with extruded insulation and their accessories for rated voltages from 1 kV (Um = 1,2 kV) up to 30 kV (Um = 36 kV)
 IEC 60503 Spools for broadcast videotape recorders (VTRS)
 IEC 60505 Evaluation and qualification of electrical insulation systems
 IEC 60507 Artificial pollution tests on high-voltage ceramic and glass insulators to be used on a.c. systems
 IEC 60510 Methods of measurement for radio equipment used in satellite earth stations
 IEC 60512 Connectors for electronic equipment – Tests and measurements
 IEC TR 60513 Fundamental aspects of safety standards for medical electrical equipment
 IEC 60515 Nuclear power plants – Instrumentation important to safety – Radiation detectors – Characteristics and test methods
 IEC 60519 Safety in installations for electroheating and electromagnetic processing
 IEC 60522 Determination of the permanent filtration of X-ray tube assemblies
 IEC 60523 Direct-current potentiometers
 IEC 60524 Direct-current resistive volt ratio boxes
 IEC 60526 High-voltage cable plug and socket connections for medical X-ray equipment
 IEC 60528 Expression of performance of air quality infra-red analyzers
 IEC 60529 Degrees of protection provided by enclosures (IP Code)
 IEC 60530 Methods for measuring the performance of electric kettles and jugs for household and similar use
 IEC 60531 Household electric thermal storage room heaters – Methods for measuring performance
 IEC 60532 Radiation protection instrumentation – Installed dose rate meters, warning assemblies and monitors – X and gamma radiation of energy between 50 keV and 7 MeV
 IEC 60533 Electrical and electronic installations in ships – Electromagnetic compatibility (EMC) – Ships with a metallic hull
 IEC 60534 Industrial-process control valves
 IEC 60539 Directly heated negative temperature coefficient thermistors
 IEC 60544 Electrical insulating materials – Determination of the effects of ionizing radiation
 IEC 60545 Guide for commissioning, operation and maintenance of hydraulic turbines
 IEC 60546 Controllers with analogue signals for use in industrial-process control systems
 IEC 60549 High-voltage fuses for the external protection of shunt capacitors
 IEC 60554 Specification for cellulosic papers for electrical purposes
 IEC 60556 Gyromagnetic materials intended for application at microwave frequencies – Measuring methods for properties
 IEC 60558 Type C helical video tape recorders
 IEC 60559 Binary floating-point arithmetic for microprocessor systems (Withdrawn)
 IEC 60560 Definitions and terminology of brush-holders for electrical machines
 IEC 60562 Measurements of incidental ionizing radiation from electronic tubes
 IEC 60564 D.C. bridges for measuring resistance
 IEC 60565 Underwater acoustics – Hydrophones – Calibration in the frequency range 0,01 Hz to 1 MHz
 IEC 60567 Oil-filled electrical equipment – Sampling of gases and analysis of free and dissolved gases – Guidance 
 IEC 60568 Nuclear power plants – Instrumentation important to safety – In-core instrumentation for neutron fluence rate (flux) measurements in power reactors
 IEC 60570 Electrical supply track systems for luminaires
 IEC 60571 Railway applications – Electronic equipment used on rolling stock
 IEC 60574 Audio-visual, video and television equipment and systems (Withdrawn)
 IEC TR 60575 Thermal-mechanical performance test and mechanical performance test on string insulator units
 IEC 60580 Medical electrical equipment – Dose area product meters
 IEC 60581 High fidelity audio equipment and systems: Minimum performance requirements
 IEC 60584 Thermocouples
 IEC 60587 Electrical insulating materials used under severe ambient conditions – Test methods for evaluating resistance to tracking and erosion
 IEC 60588 Askarels for transformers and capacitors
 IEC 60589 Methods of test for the determination of ionic impurities in electrical insulating materials by extraction with liquids
 IEC 60590 Determination of the aromatic hydrocarbon content of new mineral insulating oils
 IEC 60598 Luminaires
 IEC 60599 Mineral oil-filled electrical equipment in service – Guidance on the interpretation of dissolved and free gases analysis
 IEC 60600 Equipment for minehead assay and sorting radioactive ores in containers
 IEC 60601 Medical electrical equipment
 IEC 60602 Type B helical video recorders
 IEC 60603 Connectors for frequencies below 3 MHz for use with printed boards
 IEC 60605 Equipment reliability testing
 IEC 60609 Hydraulic turbines, storage pumps and pump-turbines – Cavitation pitting evaluation
 IEC 60613 Electrical and loading characteristics of X-ray tube assemblies for medical diagnosis
 IEC 60615 Terminology for microwave apparatus
 IEC TR 60616 Terminal and tapping markings for power transformers
 IEC 60617 Graphical symbols for diagrams
 IEC 60618 Inductive voltage dividers
 IEC 60619 Electrically operated food preparation appliances – Methods for measuring the performance
 IEC 60622 Secondary cells and batteries containing alkaline or other non-acid electrolytes – nickel-cadmium prismatic rechargeable single cells
 IEC 60623 Secondary cells and batteries containing alkaline or other non-acid electrolytes – Vented nickel-cadmium prismatic rechargeable single cells
 IEC 60624 Expression of the performance of pulse generators
 IEC 60626 Combined flexible materials for electrical insulation
 IEC 60627 Diagnostic X-ray imaging equipment – Characteristics of general purpose and mammographic anti-scatter grids
 IEC 60628 Gassing of insulating liquids under electrical stress and ionization
 IEC 60630 Maximum lamp outlines for incandescent lamps
 IEC 60633 Terminology for high-voltage direct current (HVDC) transmission
 IEC 60635 Toroidal strip-wound cores made of magnetically soft material
 IEC 60636 Flexible waveguide assembly performance
 IEC TR 60638 Criteria for assessing and coding of the commutation of rotating electrical machines for traction
 IEC 60641 Pressboard and presspaper for electrical purposes
 IEC 60642 Piezoelectric ceramic resonator units
 IEC 60644 Specification for high-voltage fuse-links for motor circuit applications
 IEC 60645 Electroacoustics – Audiometric equipment
 IEC 60648 Method of test for coefficients of friction of plastic film and sheeting for use as electrical insulation
 IEC 60651 Sound level meters (Withdrawn, replaced by IEC 61672-1:2002 and IEC 61672-2:2003)
 IEC 60652 Loading tests on overhead line structures
 IEC 60654 Industrial-process measurement and control equipment – Operating conditions
 IEC 60657 Non-ionizing radiation hazards in the frequency range from 10 MHz to 300 000 MHz
 IEC 60660 Insulators – Tests on indoor post insulators of organic material for systems with nominal voltages greater than 1 000 V up to but not including 300 kV
 IEC 60661 Methods for measuring the performance of electric household coffee makers
 IEC 60662 High-pressure sodium vapour lamps – Performance specifications
 IEC 60663 Planning of (single-sideband) power line carrier systems
 IEC 60664 Insulation coordination for equipment within low-voltage systems
 IEC 60665 A.C. electric ventilating fans and regulators for household and similar purposes
 IEC 60666 Detection and determination of specified additives in mineral insulating oils
 IEC 60667 Specification for vulcanized fibre for electrical purposes
 IEC TR 60668 Dimensions of panel areas and cut-outs for panel and rack-mounted industrial-process measurement and control instruments
 IEC 60669 Switches for household and similar fixed-electrical installations
 IEC 60670 Boxes and enclosures for electrical accessories for household and similar fixed electrical installations
 IEC 60671 Nuclear power plants – Instrumentation and control systems important to safety – Surveillance testing
 IEC 60672 Ceramic and glass insulating materials
 IEC 60674 Specification for plastic films for electrical purposes
 IEC 60675 Household electric direct-acting room heaters – Methods for measuring performance
 IEC 60676 Industrial electroheating equipment – Test methods for direct arc furnaces
 IEC 60677 Block transfers in CAMAC systems
 IEC 60679 Piezoelectric, dielectric and electrostatic oscillators of assessed quality
 IEC TS 60680 Test methods of plasma equipment for electroheat and electrochemical applications
 IEC 60682 Standard method of measuring the pinch temperature of quartz-tungsten-halogen lamps
 IEC 60683 Industrial electroheating equipment – Test methods for submerged-arc furnaces
 IEC 60684 Flexible insulating sleeving
 IEC 60688 Electrical measuring transducers for converting A.C. and D.C. electrical quantities to analogue or digital signals
 IEC 60689 Measurement and test methods for tuning fork quartz crystal units in the range from 10 kHz to 200 kHz and standard values
 IEC 60691 Thermal-links – Requirements and application guide
 IEC 60692 Nuclear instrumentation – Density gauges utilizing ionizing radiation – Definitions and test methods
 IEC 60694 Common Specifications For High-Voltage Switchgear and Control gear Standards (Withdrawn, replaced by IEC 62271-1:2007)
 IEC 60695 Fire hazard testing
 IEC 60700 Thyristor valves for high voltage direct current (HVDC) power transmission
 IEC 60702 Mineral insulated cables and their terminations with a rated voltage not exceeding 750 V
 IEC 60703 Test methods for electroheating installations with electron guns
 IEC 60704 Household and similar electrical appliances – Test code for the determination of airborne acoustical noise
 IEC 60705 Household microwave ovens – Methods for measuring performance
 IEC 60706 Maintainability of equipment
 IEC 60708 Low-frequency cables with polyolefin insulation and moisture barrier polyolefin sheath
 IEC 60709 Nuclear power plants – Instrumentation and control systems important to safety – Separation
 IEC 60712 Helical-scan video-tape cassette system using 19 mm (3/4 in) magnetic tape, known as U-format
 IEC 60713 Subroutines for CAMAC
 IEC 60715 Dimensions of low-voltage switchgear and control gear – Standardized mounting on rails for mechanical support of switchgear, control gear and accessories
 IEC 60717 Method for the determination of the space required by capacitors and resistors with unidirectional terminations
 IEC 60719 Calculation of the lower and upper limits for the average outer dimensions of cables with circular copper conductors and of rated voltages up to and including 450/750 V
 IEC 60720 Characteristics of line post insulators
 IEC 60721 Classification of environmental conditions
 IEC 60724 Short-circuit temperature limits of electric cables with rated voltages of 1 kV (Um = 1,2 kV) and 3 kV (Um = 3,6 kV)
 IEC TR 60725 Consideration of reference impedances and public supply network impedances for use in determining the disturbance characteristics of electrical equipment having a rated current ≤75 A per phase
 IEC 60726 Dry type power transformers
 IEC 60728 Cable networks for television signals, sound signals and interactive services
 IEC 60729 Multiple controllers in a CAMAC crate
 IEC 60730 Automatic electrical controls
 IEC 60731 Medical electrical equipment – Dosimeters with ionization chambers as used in radiotherapy 
 IEC 60732 Measuring methods for cylinder cores, tube cores and screw cores of magnetic oxides
 IEC 60734 Household electrical appliances – Performance – Water for testing
 IEC 60735 Measuring methods for video tape properties
 IEC TR 60736 Testing equipment for electrical energy meters
 IEC 60737 Nuclear power plants – Instrumentation important to safety – Temperature sensors (in-core and primary coolant circuit) – Characteristics and test methods
 IEC 60738 Thermistors – Directly heated positive temperature coefficient
 IEC 60740 Laminations for transformers and inductors
 IEC 60743 Live working – Terminology for tools, devices and equipment
 IEC 60744 Safety logic assemblies of nuclear power plants – Characteristics and test methods
 IEC 60745 Hand-held motor-operated electric tools – Safety
 IEC 60746 Expression of performance of electrochemical analyzers
 IEC 60747 Semiconductor devices
 IEC 60748 Semiconductor devices – Integrated circuits
 IEC 60749 Semiconductor devices – Mechanical and climatic test methods
 IEC 60750 Item designation in electrotechnology (Withdrawn! This publication has been replaced by IEC 61346-1:1996)
 IEC 60751 Industrial platinum resistance thermometers and platinum temperature sensors
 IEC 60754 Test on gases evolved during combustion of materials from cables
 IEC TR 60755 General requirements for residual current operated protective devices
 IEC 60756 Non-broadcast video tape recorders – Time base stability
 IEC 60757 Code for designation of colours
 IEC 60758 Synthetic quartz crystal – Specifications and guidelines for use
 IEC 60759 Standard test procedures for semiconductor X-ray energy spectrometers
 IEC 60760 Flat, quick-connect terminations (merged into IEC 61210:2010-08)
 IEC 60761 Equipment for continuous monitoring of radioactivity in gaseous effluents
 IEC 60763 Laminated pressboard for electrical purposes
 IEC 60767 Helical-scan video-tape cassette system using 12.65 mm (0.5 in) magnetic tape on type beta-format
 IEC 60768 Nuclear power plants – Instrumentation important to safety – Equipment for continuous in-line or on-line monitoring of radioactivity in process streams for normal and incident conditions
 IEC 60770 Transmitters for use in industrial-process control systems
 IEC 60772 Electrical penetration assemblies in containment structures for nuclear power generating stations
 IEC 60773 Test methods and apparatus for measurement of the operational characteristics of brushes
 IEC 60774 Helical-scan video tape cassette system using 12,65 mm (0,5 in) magnetic tape on type VHS
 IEC 60775 Real-time BASIC for CAMAC
 IEC TR 60778 Brush-holders for slip-rings, Group R – type RA
 IEC 60779 Industrial electroheat equipment – Test methods for electroslag remelting furnaces
 IEC TR 60782 Measurements of ultrasonic magnetostrictive transducers
 IEC TR 60788 Medical electrical equipment – Glossary of defined terms
 IEC 60793 Optical fibres
 IEC 60794 Optical fibre cables
 IEC 60796 Microprocessor system bus – 8-bit and 16-bit data (MULTIBUS I)
 IEC TR 60797 Residual strength of string insulator units of glass or ceramic material for overhead lines after mechanical damage of the dielectric
 IEC 60799 Electrical accessories – Cord sets and interconnection cord sets
 IEC 60800 Heating cables with a rated voltage of 300/500 V for comfort heating and prevention of ice formation
 IEC 60801 EMI and RFI Immunity (Withdrawn)
 IEC 60803 Recommended dimensions for hexagonal and square crimping-die cavities, indentors, ganges, outer conductor crimp sleeves and centre contact crimp barrels for R.F. cables and connectors
 IEC 60805 Guide for commissioning, operation and maintenance of storage pumps and of pump-turbines operating as pumps
 IEC 60806 Determination of the maximum symmetrical radiation field from a rotating anode X-ray tube for medical diagnosis
 IEC 60807 Rectangular connectors for frequencies below 3 MHz
 IEC 60809 Lamps for road vehicles – Dimensional, electrical and luminous requirements
 IEC 60810 Lamps for road vehicles – Performance requirements
 IEC 60811 Electric and optical fibre cables – Test methods for non-metallic materials
 IEC 60812 Analysis techniques for system reliability – Procedure for failure mode and effects analysis (FMEA)
 IEC 60814 Insulating liquids – Oil-impregnated paper and pressboard – Determination of water by automatic coulometric Karl Fischer titration
 IEC TS 60815 Selection and dimensioning of high-voltage insulators intended for use in polluted conditions
 IEC TS 60816 Guide on methods of measurement of short duration transients on low-voltage power and signal lines
 IEC 60819 Non-cellulosic papers for electrical purposes
 IEC 60821 VMEbus – Microprocessor system bus for 1 byte to 4 byte data
 IEC 60822 VSB – Parallel Sub-system Bus of the IEC 60821 VMEbus
 IEC 60824 Terminology related to microprocessors
 IEC 60825 Safety of laser products
 IEC 60826 Design criteria of overhead transmission lines
 IEC 60828 Pin allocations for microprocessor systems using the IEC 60603-2connector
 IEC 60831 Shunt power capacitors of the self-healing type for a.c. systems having a rated voltage up to and including 1 000 V
 IEC 60832 Live working – Insulating sticks and attachable devices
 IEC 60834 Tele-protection equipment of power systems – Performance and testing
 IEC 60835 Methods of measurement for equipment used in digital microwave radio transmission systems
 IEC 60836 Specifications for unused silicone insulating liquids for electrotechnical purposes
 IEC 60838 Miscellaneous lampholders
 IEC 60839 Alarm and electronic security systems
 IEC 60840 Power cables with extruded insulation and their accessories for rated voltages above 30 kV (Um = 36 kV) up to 150 kV (Um = 170 kV) – Test methods and requirements
 IEC 60841 Audio recording – PCM encoder/decoder system
 IEC 60843 Helical-scan video tape cassette system using 8 mm magnetic tape – 8 mm video
 IEC 60846 Radiation protection instrumentation – Ambient and/or directional dose equivalent (rate) meters and/or monitors for beta, X and gamma radiation
 IEC 60848 GRAFCET specification language for sequential function charts
 IEC 60849 Sound Systems for Emergency Purposes (Withdrawn)
 IEC 60850 Railway applications – Supply voltages of traction systems
 IEC 60851 Methods of test for winding wires
 IEC 60852 Outline dimensions of transformers and inductors for use in telecommunication and electronic equipment
 IEC 60853 Calculation of the cyclic and emergency current rating of cables
 IEC TR 60854 Methods of measuring the performance of ultrasonic pulse-echo diagnostic equipment
 IEC 60855 Live working – Insulating foam-filled tubes and solid rods
 IEC 60856 Prerecorded optical reflective video disk system 'Laser vision' 50 Hz/625 lines – PAL
 IEC 60857 Prerecorded optical reflective video disk system 'Laser vision' 60 Hz/525 lines – M/NTSC
 IEC 60860 Radiation protection instrumentation – Warning equipment for criticality accidents
 IEC 60861 Equipment for monitoring of radionuclides in liquid effluents and surface waters
 IEC 60862 Surface acoustic wave (SAW) filters of assessed quality
 IEC 60864 Standardization of interconnections between broadcasting transmitters or transmitter systems and supervisory equipment
 IEC 60865 Short-circuit currents – Calculation of effects
 IEC 60867 Insulating liquids – Specifications for unused liquids based on synthetic aromatic hydrocarbons
 IEC 60869 Fibre optic interconnecting devices and passive components – Fibre optic passive power control devices
 IEC 60870 Telecontrol equipment and systems
 IEC 60871 Shunt capacitors for a.c. power systems having a rated voltage above 1 000 V
 IEC 60873 Electrical and pneumatic analogue chart recorders for use in industrial-process systems
 IEC 60874 Fibre optic interconnecting devices and passive components – Connectors for optical fibres and cables
 IEC 60875 Fibre optic interconnecting devices and passive components – Non-wavelength-selective fibre optic branching devices
 IEC 60876 Fibre optic interconnecting devices and passive components – Fibre optic spatial switches
 IEC TR 60877 Procedures for ensuring the cleanliness of industrial-process measurement and control equipment in oxygen service
 IEC TR 60878 Graphical symbols for electrical equipment in medical practice
 IEC 60879 Performance and construction of electric circulating fans and regulators
 IEC 60880 Nuclear power plants – Instrumentation and control systems important to safety – Software aspects for computer-based systems performing category A functions
 IEC 60882 Pre-heat requirements for starterless tubular fluorescent lamps
 IEC 60883 Measuring method for chrominance signal-to-random noise ratio for video tape recorders
 IEC 60884 Plugs and socket-outlets for household and similar purposes
 IEC 60885 Electrical test methods for electric cables
 IEC TR 60886 Investigations on test procedures for ultrasonic cleaners
 IEC TR 60887 Glass bulb designation system for lamps
 IEC 60888 Zinc-coated steel wires for stranded conductors
 IEC 60889 Hard-drawn aluminium wire for overhead line conductors
 IEC TR 60890 A method of temperature-rise verification of low-voltage switchgear and controlgear assemblies by calculation
 IEC 60891 Photovoltaic devices – Procedures for temperature and irradiance corrections to measured I-V characteristics
 IEC 60893 Insulating materials – Industrial rigid laminated sheets based on thermosetting resins for electrical purposes
 IEC 60895 Live working – Conductive clothing for use at nominal voltage up to 800 kV a.c. and +/- 600 kV d.c.
 IEC 60896 Stationary lead-acid batteries
 IEC 60897 Methods for the determination of the lightning breakdown voltage of insulating liquids
 IEC 60898 Electrical accessories – Circuit-breakers for overcurrent protection for household and similar installations
 IEC TS 60899 Sampling rate and source encoding for professional digital audio recording
 IEC 60900 Live working – Hand tools for use up to 1 000 V a.c. and 1 500 V d.c.
 IEC 60901 Single-capped fluorescent lamps – Performance specifications
 IEC 60903 Live working – Electrical insulating gloves
 IEC 60904 Photovoltaic devices
 IEC 60906 IEC system of plugs and socket-outlets for household and similar purposes 
 IEC 60908 Audio recording – Compact disc digital audio system
 IEC 60909 Short-circuit currents in three-phase a.c. systems
 IEC 60910 Containment monitoring instrumentation for early detection of developing deviations from normal operation in light water reactors
 IEC 60911 Measurements for monitoring adequate cooling within the core of pressurized light water reactors
 IEC 60912 Nuclear instrumentation – ECL (emitter coupled logic) front panel interconnections in counter logic
 IEC 60913 Railway applications – Fixed installations – Electric traction overhead contact lines
 IEC 60915 Capacitors and resistors for use in electronic equipment – Preferred dimensions of shaft ends, bushes and for the mounting of single-hole, bush-mounted, shaft-operated electronic components
 IEC 60917 Modular order for the development of mechanical structures for electronic equipment practices
 IEC 60918 PVC insulated ribbon cable with a pitch of 1.27 mm suitable for insulation displacement termination
 IEC TR 60919 Performance of high-voltage direct current (HVDC) systems with line-commutated converters
 IEC 60921 Ballasts for tubular fluorescent lamps – Performance requirements
 IEC 60923 Auxiliaries for lamps – Ballasts for discharge lamps (excluding tubular fluorescent lamps) – Performance requirements
 IEC 60927 Auxiliaries for lamps – Starting devices (other than glow starters)- Performance requirements
 IEC 60929 AC and/or DC-supplied electronic control gear for tubular fluorescent lamps – Performance requirements
 IEC TR 60930 Guidelines for administrative, medical and nursing staff concerned with the safe use of medical electrical equipment and medical electrical systems
 IEC 60931 Shunt power capacitors of the non-self-healing type for a.c. systems having a rated voltage up to and including 1000 V
 IEC 60933 Audio, video and audiovisual systems – Interconnections and matching values
 IEC 60934 Circuit-breakers for equipment (CBE)
 IEC 60935 Nuclear instrumentation – Modular high speed data acquisition system – FASTBUS
 IEC 60938 Fixed inductors for electromagnetic interference suppression
 IEC 60939 Passive filter units for electromagnetic interference suppression
 IEC 60940 Guidance information on the application of capacitors, resistors, inductors and complete filter units for electromagnetic interference suppression
 IEC 60942 Electroacoustics – Sound calibrators
 IEC TR 60943 Guidance concerning the permissible temperature rise for parts of electrical equipment, in particular for terminals
 IEC 60944 Guide for the maintenance of silicone transformer liquids
 IEC 60945 Maritime navigation and radiocommunication equipment and systems – General requirements – Methods of testing and required test results
 IEC 60946 Binary direct voltage signals for process measurement and control systems
 IEC 60947 Low-voltage switchgear and control gear
 IEC 60948 Numeric keyboard for home electronic systems (HES)
 IEC 60949 Calculation of thermally permissible short-circuit currents, taking into account non-adiabatic heating effects
 IEC 60950 Information technology equipment – Safety
 IEC 60951 Nuclear power plants – Instrumentation important to safety – Radiation monitoring for accident and post-accident conditions
 IEC 60952 Aircraft batteries
 IEC 60953 Rules for steam turbine thermal acceptance tests
 IEC 60958 Digital audio interface
 IEC 60960 Functional design criteria for a safety parameter display system for nuclear power stations
 IEC 60961 Helical-scan video tape cassette system using 12,65 mm (0,5 in) magnetic tape on type L
 IEC 60963 Specification for unused polybutenes
 IEC 60964 Nuclear power plants – Control rooms – Design
 IEC 60965 Nuclear power plants – Control rooms – Supplementary control room for reactor shutdown without access to the main control room
 IEC 60966 Radio frequency and coaxial cable assemblies
 IEC 60968 Self-ballasted fluorescent lamps for general lighting services – Safety requirements
 IEC 60969 Self-ballasted compact fluorescent lamps for general lighting services – Performance requirements
 IEC 60970 Insulating liquids – Methods for counting and sizing particles
 IEC 60973 Test procedures for germanium gamma-ray detectors
 IEC 60974 Arc welding equipment
 IEC 60976 Medical electrical equipment – Medical electron accelerators – Functional performance characteristics
 IEC TR 60977 Medical electrical equipment – Medical electron accelerators – Guidelines for functional performance characteristics
 IEC 60979 Wires for wire wrapping applications
 IEC 60980 Recommended practices for seismic qualification of electrical equipment of the safety system for nuclear generating stations
 IEC 60981 Extra heavy-duty electrical rigid steel conduits
 IEC 60982 Level measuring systems utilizing ionizing radiation with continuous or switching output
 IEC 60983 Miniature lamps
 IEC 60984 Live working – Electrical insulating sleeves
 IEC 60986 Short-circuit temperature limits of electric cables with rated voltages from 6 kV (Um = 7,2 kV) up to 30 kV (Um = 36 kV)
 IEC 60987 Nuclear power plants – Instrumentation and control important to safety – Hardware design requirements for computer-based systems
 IEC 60988 Nuclear power plants – Instrumentation important to safety – Acoustic monitoring systems for detection of loose parts: characteristics, design criteria and operational procedures 
 IEC 60989 Separating transformers, autotransformers, variable transformers and reactors
 IEC 60990 Methods of measurement of touch current and protective conductor current
 IEC 60993 Electrolyte for vented nickel-cadmium cells
 IEC 60994 Guide for field measurement of vibrations and pulsations in hydraulic machines (turbines, storage pumps and pump-turbines)
 IEC TR 60996 Method for verifying accuracy of tan delta measurements applicable to capacitors
 IEC 60998 Connecting devices for low-voltage circuits for household and similar purposes
 IEC 60999 Connecting devices – Electrical copper conductors – Safety requirements for screw-type and screwless-type clamping units
 IEC 61000 Electromagnetic compatibility (EMC)
 IEC 61003 Industrial-process control systems – Instruments with analogue inputs and two- or multi-position outputs
 IEC 61005 Radiation protection instrumentation – Neutron ambient dose equivalent (rate) meters
 IEC 61007 Transformers and inductors for use in electronic and telecommunication equipment – Measuring methods and test procedures
 IEC 61008 Residual current operated circuit-breakers without integral overcurrent protection for household and similar uses (RCCBs)
 IEC 61009 Residual current operated circuit breakers with integral overcurrent protection for household and similar uses (RCBOs)
 IEC 61010 Safety requirements for electrical equipment for measurement, control, and laboratory use
 IEC 61012 Filters for the measurement of audible sound in the presence of ultrasound
 IEC 61014 Programmes for reliability growth
 IEC TR 61015 Brush-holders for electrical machines. Guide to the measurement of the static thrust applied to brushes
 IEC 61016 Helical-scan digital component video cassette recording system using 19 mm magnetic tape (format D-1)
 IEC 61017 Radiation protection instrumentation – Transportable, mobile or installed equipment to measure photon radiation for environmental monitoring
 IEC 61018 Surface acoustic wave (SAW) resonators
 IEC 61020 Electromechanical switches for use in electrical and electronic equipment
 IEC 61021 Laminated core packages for transformers and inductors used in telecommunication and electronic equipment
 IEC 61023 Maritime navigation and radiocommunication equipment and systems – Marine speed and distance measuring equipment (SDME) – Performance requirements, methods of testing and required test results
 IEC 61024 Protection of structures against lightning (Withdrawn, replaced by parts of IEC 62305)
 IEC 61025 Fault tree analysis (FTA)
 IEC 61028 Electrical measuring instruments – X-Y recorders
 IEC 61029 Safety of transportable motor-operated electric tools
 IEC 61030 Domestic Digital Bus – a standard for a low-speed multi-master serial communication bus for home automation applications. (Withdrawn)
 IEC 61031 Design, location and application criteria for installed area gamma radiation dose rate monitoring equipment for use in nuclear power plants during normal operation and anticipated operational occurrences
 IEC 61032 Protection of persons and equipment by enclosures – Probes for verification
 IEC 61033 Test methods for the determination of bond strength of impregnating agents to an enamelled wire substrate
 IEC 61034 Measurement of smoke density of cables burning under defined conditions
 IEC 61039 Classification of insulating liquids
 IEC 61041 Non-broadcast video tape recorders. Methods of measurement
 IEC 61043 Electroacoustics – Instruments for the measurement of sound intensity – Measurements with pairs of pressure sensing microphones
 IEC TR 61044 Opportunity-charging of lead-acid traction batteries
 IEC 61047 DC or AC supplied electronic step-down converters for filament lamps – Performance requirements
 IEC 61048 Auxiliaries for lamps – Capacitors for use in tubular fluorescent and other discharge lamp circuits – General and safety requirements
 IEC 61049 Capacitors for use in tubular fluorescent and other discharge lamp circuits. Performance requirements
 IEC 61050 Transformers for tubular discharge lamps having a no-load output voltage exceeding 1000 V (generally called neon-transformers). General and safety requirements
 IEC 61051 Varistors for use in electronic equipment
 IEC 61052 IEC 1052 FASTBUS standard routines. Standard routines for use with FASTBUS data acquisition system
 IEC 61053 Helical-scan video tape cassette system using 12,65 mm (0,5 in) magnetic tape on type Beta format – FM audio recording
 IEC TR 61055 Measurement techniques and operational adjustments of broadcast VTRs
 IEC 61056 General purpose lead-acid batteries (valve-regulated types)
 IEC 61058 Switches for appliances
 IEC 61061 Non-impregnated densified laminated wood for electrical purposes
 IEC 61063 Acoustics – Measurement of airborne noise emitted by steam turbines and driven machinery
 IEC 61064 Acceptance tests for steam turbine speed control systems
 IEC 61065 Method for evaluating the low temperature flow properties of mineral insulating oils after ageing
 IEC 61067 Specification for glass and glass polyester fibre woven tapes
 IEC 61068 Specification for polyester fibre woven tapes
 IEC 61069 Industrial-process measurement, control and automation – Evaluation of system properties for the purpose of system assessment
 IEC 61070 Compliance test procedures for steady-state availability
 IEC 61071 Capacitors for power electronics
 IEC 61073 Fibre optic interconnecting devices and passive components – Mechanical splices and fusion splice protectors for optical fibres and cables
 IEC 61076 Connectors for electronic equipment – Product requirements
 IEC 61077 Helical-scan video tape cassette system using 12.65 mm (0.5 in) magnetic tape on type VHS – Compact VHS video cassette
 IEC 61078 Reliability block diagrams
 IEC 61079 Methods of measurement on receivers for satellite broadcast transmissions in the 12 GHz band
 IEC 61080 Guide to the measurement of equivalent electrical parameters of quartz crystal units
 IEC TS 61081 Pneumatic instruments driven by associated process gas – Safe installation and operating procedures – Guidelines
 IEC 61082 Preparation of documents used in electrotechnology
 IEC 61083 Instruments and software used for measurement in high-voltage and high-current tests
 IEC 61084 Cable trunking systems and cable ducting systems for electrical installations
 IEC TS 61085 General considerations for telecommunication services for electric power systems
 IEC 61086 Coatings for loaded printed wire boards (conformal coatings)
 IEC TR 61088 Characteristics and measurements of ultrasonic piezoceramic transducers
 IEC 61089 Round wire concentric lay overhead electrical stranded conductors
 IEC 61094 Measurement microphones
 IEC 61095 Electromechanical contactors for household and similar purposes
 IEC 61096 Methods of measuring the characteristics of reproducing equipment for digital audio compact discs
 IEC 61097 Global maritime distress and safety system (GMDSS)
 IEC 61098 Radiation protection instrumentation – Installed personnel surface contamination monitoring assemblies
 IEC 61099 Insulating liquids – Specifications for unused synthetic organic esters for electrical purposes
 IEC 61104 Compact disc video system – 12 cm CD-V
 IEC 61105 Reference tapes for video tape recorder systems
 IEC 61106 Videodisks – Methods of measurement for parameters
 IEC 61108 Maritime navigation and radiocommunication equipment and systems – Global navigation satellite systems (GNSS)
 IEC 61109 Insulators for overhead lines – Composite suspension and tension insulators for a.c. systems with a nominal voltage greater than 1 000 V – Definitions, test methods and acceptance criteria
 IEC 61111 Live working – Electrical insulating matting
 IEC 61112 Live working – Electrical insulating blankets
 IEC 61114 Receiving antennas for satellite broadcast transmissions in the 11/12 GHz band
 IEC 61115 Expression of performance of sample handling systems for process analyzers
 IEC 61116 Electromechanical equipment guide for small hydroelectric installations
 IEC 61118 Helical-scan video tape cassette system using 12,65 mm (0,5 in) magnetic tape – Type M2
 IEC 61119 Digital audio tape cassette system (DAT)
 IEC 61120 Digital audio tape recorder reel to reel system, using 6,3 mm magnetic tape, for professional use
 IEC 61121 Tumble dryers for household use – Methods for measuring the performance
 IEC 61123 Reliability testing – Compliance test plans for success ratio
 IEC 61124 Reliability testing – Compliance tests for constant failure rate and constant failure intensity
 IEC 61125 Unused hydrocarbon based insulating liquids – Test methods for evaluating the oxidation stability
 IEC 61126 Procedure for use in the preparation of maximum lamp outlines
 IEC TR 61127 High pressure xenon short arc lamps – Dimensional, electrical and photometric data and cap types
 IEC 61131 Industrial-process measurement and control – Programmable controllers
 IEC 61133 Railway applications – Rolling stock – Testing of rolling stock on completion of construction and before entry into service
 IEC 61138 Cables for portable earthing and short-circuiting equipment
 IEC 61140 Protection against electric shock – Common aspects for installation and equipment
 IEC TR 61141 Upper frequency limit of r.f. coaxial connectors
 IEC 61143 Electrical measuring instruments – X-t recorders
 IEC 61144 Test method for the determination of oxygen index of insulating liquids
 IEC 61145 Calibration and usage of ionization chamber systems for assay of radionuclides
 IEC 61146 Video cameras (PAL/SECAM/NTSC) – Methods of measurement
 IEC 61148 Terminal markings for valve device stacks and assemblies and for power conversion equipment
 IEC TS 61149 Guide for safe handling and operation of mobile radio equipment
 IEC 61152 Dimensions of metal-sheathed thermometer elements
 IEC 61156 Multicore and symmetrical pair/quad cables for digital communications
 IEC 61157 Standard means for the reporting of the acoustic output of medical diagnostic ultrasonic equipment
 IEC 61158 Industrial communication networks – Fieldbus specifications
 IEC 61160 Design review
 IEC 61161 Ultrasonics – Power measurement – Radiation force balances and performance requirements
 IEC 61162 Maritime navigation and radiocommunication equipment and systems – Digital interfaces
 IEC 61163 Reliability stress screening
 IEC 61164 Reliability growth – Statistical test and estimation methods
 IEC 61165 Application of Markov techniques
 IEC 61167 Metal halide lamps – Performance specification
 IEC 61168 Radiotherapy simulators – Functional performance characteristics
 IEC 61169 Radio frequency connectors
 IEC TS 61170 Radiotherapy simulators – Guidelines for functional performance characteristics
 IEC 61171 Radiation protection instrumentation – Monitoring equipment – Atmospheric radioactive iodines in the environment
 IEC 61172 Radiation protection instrumentation – Monitoring equipment – Radioactive aerosols in the environment
 IEC 61174 Maritime navigation and radiocommunication equipment and systems – Electronic chart display and information system (ECDIS) – Operational and performance requirements, methods of testing and required test results
 IEC 61175 Industrial systems, installations and equipment and industrial products – Designation of signals
 IEC 61176 Hand-held electric mains voltage operated circular saws – Methods for measuring the performance
 IEC 61178 Quartz crystal units – A specification in the IEC Quality Assessment System for Electronic Components (IECQ)
 IEC 61179 Helical-scan digital composite video cassette recording system using 19 mm magnetic tape, format D2 (NTSC, PAL, PAL-M)
 IEC 61180 High-voltage test techniques for low-voltage equipment – Definitions, test and procedure requirements, test equipment
 IEC 61181 Mineral oil-filled electrical equipment – Application of dissolved gas analysis (DGA) to factory tests on electrical equipment
 IEC PAS 61182 Generic requirements for printed board assembly products manufacturing description data and transfer methodology
 IEC 61183 Electroacoustics – Random-incidence and diffuse-field calibration of sound level meters
 IEC 61184 Bayonet lampholders
 IEC 61187 Electrical and electronic measuring equipment – Documentation
 IEC 61188 Printed boards and printed board assemblies – Design and use
 IEC 61189 Test methods for electrical materials, interconnection structures and assemblies
 IEC 61190 Attachment materials for electronic assembly
 IEC 61191 Printed board assemblies
 IEC 61192 Workmanship requirements for soldered electronic assemblies
 IEC 61193 Quality assessment systems
 IEC 61194 Characteristic parameters of stand-alone photovoltaic (PV) systems (Withdrawn, replaced by IEC TS 61836:2007)
 IEC 61195 Double-capped fluorescent lamps – Safety specifications
 IEC 61196 Coaxial communication cables
 IEC 61197 Insulating liquids – Linear flame propagation – Test method using a glass-fibre tape
 IEC 61198 Mineral insulating oils – Methods for the determination of 2-furfural and related compounds
 IEC 61199 Single-capped fluorescent lamps – Safety specifications
 IEC 61200 Electrical installation guide
 IEC TS 61201 Use of conventional touch voltage limits – Application guide
 IEC 61203 Synthetic organic esters for electrical purposes – Guide for maintenance of transformer esters in equipment
 IEC 61204 Low-voltage power supply devices, d.c. output – Performance characteristics
 IEC 61205 Ultrasonics – Dental descaler systems – Measurement and declaration of the output characteristics
 IEC TS 61206 Ultrasonics – Continuous-wave Doppler systems – Test procedures
 IEC 61207 Expression of performance of gas analyzers
 IEC 61210 Connecting devices – Flat quick-connect terminations for electrical copper conductors – Safety requirements
 IEC 61211 Insulators of ceramic material or glass for overhead lines with a nominal voltage greater than 1 000 V – Impulse puncture testing in air
 IEC 61212 Insulating materials – Industrial rigid round laminated tubes and rods based on thermosetting resins for electrical purposes
 IEC 61213 Analogue audio recording on video tape – Polarity of magnetization
 IEC 61215 Terrestrial photovoltaic (PV) modules – Design qualification and type approval
 IEC 61217 Radiotherapy equipment – Coordinates, movements and scales
 IEC 61219 Live working – Earthing or earthing and short-circuiting equipment using lances as a short-circuiting device – Lance earthing
 IEC 61223 Evaluation and routine testing in medical imaging departments
 IEC 61224 Nuclear reactors – Response time in resistance temperature detectors (RTD) – In situ measurements
 IEC 61225 Nuclear power plants – Instrumentation and control systems important to safety – Requirements for electrical supplies
 IEC 61226 Nuclear power plants – Instrumentation and control important to safety – Classification of instrumentation and control functions
 IEC 61227 Nuclear power plants – Control rooms – Operator controls
 IEC 61228 Fluorescent ultraviolet lamps used for tanning – Measurement and specification method
 IEC 61229 Rigid protective covers for live working on a.c. installations
 IEC 61230 Live working – Portable equipment for earthing or earthing and short-circuiting
 IEC 61231 International lamp coding system (ILCOS)
 IEC 61232 Aluminium-clad steel wires for electrical purposes
 IEC 61234 Method of test for the hydrolytic stability of electrical insulating materials
 IEC 61235 Live working – Insulating hollow tubes for electrical purposes
 IEC 61236 Live working – Saddles, stick clamps and their accessories
 IEC 61237 Broadcast video tape recorders – Methods of measurement
 IEC 61238 Compression and mechanical connectors for power cables for rated voltages up to 30 kV (Um = 36 kV)
 IEC 61239 Nuclear instrumentation – Portable gamma radiation meters and spectrometers used for prospecting – Definitions, requirements and calibration
 IEC 61240 Piezoelectric devices – Preparation of outline drawings of surface-mounted devices (SMD) for frequency control and selection – General rules
 IEC 61241 Electrical apparatus for use in the presence of combustible dust (Withdrawn)
 IEC 61242 Electrical accessories – Cable reels for household and similar purposes
 IEC 61243 Live working – Voltage detectors
 IEC TS 61244 Determination of long-term radiation ageing in polymers
 IEC TS 61245 Artificial pollution tests on high-voltage ceramic and glass insulators to be used on d.c. systems
 IEC 61247 PM-cores made of magnetic oxides and associated parts – Dimensions
 IEC 61248 Transformers and inductors for use in electronic and telecommunication equipment
 IEC 61249 Materials for printed boards and other interconnecting structures
 IEC 61250 Nuclear reactors – Instrumentation and control systems important for safety – Detection of leakage in coolant systems
 IEC 61251 Electrical insulating materials and systems – AC voltage endurance evaluation
 IEC 61252 Electroacoustics – Specifications for personal sound exposure meters
 IEC 61253 Piezoelectric ceramic resonators – A specification in the IEC quality assessment system for electronic components (IECQ)
 IEC 61254 Electric shavers for household use – Methods for measuring the performance
 IEC 61256 Radiation protection instrumentation – Installed monitors for the detection of radioactive contamination of laundry
 IEC TR 61258 Guidelines for the development and use of medical electrical equipment educational materials
 IEC 61260 Electroacoustics – Octave-band and fractional-octave-band filters
 IEC 61261 Piezoelectric ceramic filters for use in electronic equipment – A specification in the IEC quality assessment system for electronic components (IECQ)
 IEC 61262 Medical electrical equipment – Characteristics of electro-optical X-ray image intensifiers
 IEC 61265 Electroacoustics – Instruments for measurement of aircraft noise – Performance requirements for systems to measure one-third-octave-band sound pressure levels in noise certification of transport-category aeroplanes
 IEC 61266 Ultrasonics – Hand-held probe Doppler foetal heartbeat detectors – Performance requirements and methods of measurement and reporting
 IEC 61267 Medical diagnostic X-ray equipment – Radiation conditions for use in the determination of characteristics
 IEC 61270 Capacitors for microwave ovens
 IEC 61274 Fibre optic interconnecting devices and passive components – Adaptors for fibre optic connectors
 IEC 61275 Radiation protection instrumentation – Measurement of discrete radionuclides in the environment – In situ photon spectrometry system using a germanium detector
 IEC 61277 Terrestrial photovoltaic (PV) power generating systems – General and guide (Withdrawn)
 IEC 61280 Fibre optic communication subsystem basic test procedures
 IEC 61281 Fibre optic communication subsystems
 IEC TR 61282 Fibre optic communication system design guides
 IEC 61284 Overhead lines – Requirements and tests for fittings
 IEC 61285 Industrial-process control – Safety of analyser houses
 IEC 61286 Character set with electrotechnical symbols (Withdrawn)
 IEC 61287 Railway applications – Power converters installed on board rolling stock
 IEC TR 61289 High frequency surgical equipment – Operation and maintenance
 IEC 61290 Optical amplifiers – Test methods
 IEC 61291 Optical amplifiers
 IEC TR 61292 Optical amplifiers
 IEC 61293 Marking of electrical equipment with ratings related to electrical supply – Safety requirements
 IEC TR 61294 Insulating liquids – Determination of the partial discharge inception voltage (PDIV) – Test procedure
 IEC TR 61295 Calibration tapes for broadcast VTRs
 IEC 61297 Industrial-process control systems – Classification of adaptive controllers for the purpose of evaluation
 IEC 61298 Process measurement and control devices – General methods and procedures for evaluating performance
 IEC 61300 Fibre optic interconnecting devices and passive components – Basic test and measurement procedures
 IEC 61301 Nuclear instrumentation – Digital bus for NIM instruments
 IEC 61302 Electrical insulating materials – Method to evaluate the resistance to tracking and erosion – Rotating wheel dip test
 IEC 61303 Medical electrical equipment – Radionuclide calibrators – Particular methods for describing performance
 IEC 61304 Nuclear instrumentation – Liquid-scintillation counting systems – Performance verification
 IEC 61305 Household high-fidelity audio equipment and systems – Methods of measuring and specifying the performance
 IEC 61307 Industrial microwave heating installations – Test methods for the determination of power output
 IEC 61308 High-frequency dielectric heating installations – Test methods for the determination of power output
 IEC 61309 Deep-fat fryers for household use – Methods for measuring the performance
 IEC 61310 Safety of machinery – Indication, marking and actuation
 IEC 61314 Fibre optic interconnecting devices and passive components – Fibre optic fan-outs
 IEC 61315 Calibration of fibre-optic power meters
 IEC 61316 Industrial cable reels
 IEC 61318 Live working – Conformity assessment applicable to tools, devices and equipment
 IEC 61319 Interconnections of satellite receiving equipment
 IEC 61322 Radiation protection instrumentation – Installed dose equivalent rate meters, warning assemblies and monitors for neutron radiation of energy from thermal to 15 MeV
 IEC 61325 Insulators for overhead lines with a nominal voltage above 1000 V – Ceramic or glass insulator units for d.c. systems – Definitions, test methods and acceptance criteria
 IEC 61326 Electrical equipment for measurement, control and laboratory use – EMC requirements
 IEC 61327 Helical-scan digital composite video cassette recording system using 12,65 mm (0,5 in) magnetic tape – Format D-3
 IEC 61328 Live working – Guidelines for the installation of transmission and distribution line conductors and earth wires – Stringing equipment and accessory items
 IEC 61329 Sound system equipment – Methods of measuring and specifying the performance of sounders (electroacoustic transducers for tone production)
 IEC 61331 Protective devices against diagnostic medical X-radiation
 IEC 61332 Soft ferrite material classification
 IEC 61333 Marking on U and E ferrite cores
 IEC 61334 Distribution automation using distribution line carrier systems – a standard for low-speed reliable power line communications by electricity meters, water meters and SCADA
 IEC 61335 Nuclear instrumentation – Bore-hole apparatus for X-ray fluorescence analysis
 IEC 61336 Nuclear instrumentation – Thickness measurement systems utilizing ionizing radiation – Definitions and test methods
 IEC 61337 Filters using waveguide type dielectric resonators
 IEC 61338 Waveguide type dielectric resonators
 IEC 61340 Electrostatics
 IEC 61341 Method of measurement of centre beam intensity and beam angle(s) of reflector lamps
 IEC 61343 Nuclear reactor instrumentation – Boiling light water reactors (BWR) – Measurements in the reactor vessel for monitoring adequate cooling within the core
 IEC 61345 UV test for photovoltaic (PV) modules (Withdrawn)
 IEC 61346 Industrial systems, installations and equipment and industrial products – Structuring principles and reference designations (Withdrawn, replaced by IEC 81346)
 IEC 61347 Lamp control gear
 IEC TR 61352 Mnemonics and symbols for integrated circuits
 IEC 61355 Classification and designation of documents for plants, systems and equipment
 IEC 61360 Standard data element types with associated classification scheme
 IEC 61362 Guide to specification of hydraulic turbine control systems
 IEC 61363 Electrical installations of ships and mobile and fixed offshore units
 IEC TR 61364 Nomenclature for hydroelectric powerplant machinery
 IEC TR 61366 Hydraulic turbines, storage pumps and pump-turbines – Tendering Documents
 IEC TS 61370 Steam turbines – Steam purity
 IEC 61373 Railway applications – Rolling stock equipment – Shock and vibration tests
 IEC 61375 Electronic railway equipment – Train communication network (TCN)
 IEC 61377 Railway applications – Rolling stock – Combined test method for traction systems
 IEC 61378 Converter transformers
 IEC 61386 Conduit systems for cable management
 IEC TS 61390 Ultrasonics – Real-time pulse-echo systems – Test procedures to determine performance specifications
 IEC 61391 Ultrasonics – Pulse-echo scanners
 IEC 61394 Overhead lines – Requirements for greases for aluminium, aluminium alloy and steel bare conductors
 IEC 61395 Overhead electrical conductors – Creep test procedures for stranded conductors
 IEC 61400 Wind turbines
 IEC 61427 Secondary cells and batteries for renewable energy storage – General requirements and methods of test
 IEC 61429 Marking of secondary cells and batteries with the international recycling symbol ISO 7000-1135
 IEC TS 61430 Secondary cells and batteries – Test methods for checking the performance of devices designed for reducing explosion hazards – Lead-acid starter batteries
 IEC TR 61431 Guide for the use of monitor systems for lead-acid traction batteries
 IEC 61434 Secondary cells and batteries containing alkaline or other non-acid electrolytes – Guide to designation of current in alkaline secondary cell and battery standards
 IEC 61435 Nuclear instrumentation – High-purity germanium crystals for radiation detectors – Measurement methods of basic characteristics
 IEC TR 61438 Possible safety and health hazards in the use of alkaline secondary cells and batteries – Guide to equipment manufacturers and users
 IEC 61439 Low-voltage switchgear and control gear assemblies
 IEC 61442 Test methods for accessories for power cables with rated voltages from 6 kV (Um = 7,2 kV) up to 30 kV (Um = 36 kV)
 IEC 61443 Short-circuit temperature limits of electric cables with rated voltages above 30 kV (Um = 36 kV)
 IEC 61445 Digital Test Interchange Format (DTIF)
 IEC 61452 Nuclear instrumentation – Measurement of gamma-ray emission rates of radionuclides – Calibration and use of germanium spectrometers
 IEC 61453 Nuclear instrumentation – Scintillation gamma ray detector systems for the assay of radionuclides – Calibration and routine tests
 IEC 61462 Composite hollow insulators – Pressurized and unpressurized insulators for use in electrical equipment with rated voltage greater than 1 000 V – Definitions, test methods, acceptance criteria and design recommendations
 IEC TS 61463 Bushings – Seismic qualification
 IEC TS 61464 Insulated bushings – Guide for the interpretation of dissolved gas analysis (DGA) in bushings where oil is the impregnating medium of the main insulation (generally paper)
 IEC 61466 Composite string insulator units for overhead lines with a nominal voltage greater than 1 000 V
 IEC 61467 Insulators for overhead lines – Insulator strings and sets for lines with a nominal voltage greater than 1 000 V – AC power arc tests 
 IEC 61468 Nuclear power plants – In-core instrumentation – Characteristics and test methods of self-powered neutron detectors 
 IEC 61472 Live working – Minimum approach distances for a.c. systems in the voltage range 72,5 kV to 800 kV – A method of calculation 
 IEC 61477 Live working – Minimum requirements for the utilization of tools, devices and equipment 
 IEC 61478 Live working – Ladders of insulating material 
 IEC 61479 Live working – Flexible conductor covers (line hoses) of insulating material 
 IEC 61481 Live working – Phase comparators
 IEC 61482 Live working – Protective clothing against the thermal hazards of an electric arc
 IEC 61496 Safety of machinery – Electro-sensitive protective equipment
 IEC 61497 Nuclear power plants – Electrical interlocks for functions important to safety – Recommendations for design and implementation 
 IEC 61499 Function blocks
 IEC 61500 Nuclear power plants – Instrumentation and control important to safety – Data communication in systems performing category A functions
 IEC 61501 Nuclear reactor instrumentation – Wide range neutron fluence rate meter – Mean square voltage method
 IEC 61502 Nuclear power plants – Pressurized water reactors – Vibration monitoring of internal structures
 IEC 61504 Nuclear power plants – Instrumentation and control systems important to safety – Plant-wide radiation monitoring
 IEC 61506 Industrial-process measurement and control – Documentation of application software
 IEC 61508 Functional safety of electrical/electronic/programmable electronic safety-related systems
 IEC 61511 Functional safety – safety instrumented systems for the process industry sector
 IEC 61512 Batch control
 IEC 61513 Nuclear power plants – Instrumentation and control important to safety – General requirements for systems
 IEC 61514 Industrial process control systems – Methods of evaluating the performance of valve positioners with pneumatic outputs
 IEC 61515 Mineral insulated thermocouple cables and thermocouples
 IEC 61518 Mating dimensions between differential pressure (type) measuring instruments and flanged-on shut-off devices up to 413 BAR (41,3 MPa)
 IEC 61520 Metal thermowells for thermometer sensors – Functional dimensions
 IEC 61523 Delay and Power Calculation Standards
 IEC 61526 Radiation protection instrumentation – Measurement of personal dose equivalents Hp(10) and Hp(0,07) for X, gamma, neutron and beta radiations – Direct reading personal dose equivalent meters
 IEC 61534 Powertrack systems
 IEC 61535 Installation couplers intended for permanent connection in fixed installations
 IEC 61537 Cable management – Cable tray systems and cable ladder systems
 IEC 61540 Electrical accessories – Portable residual current devices without integral overcurrent protection for household and similar use (PRCDs)
 IEC 61543 Residual current-operated protective devices (RCDs) for household and similar use – Electromagnetic compatibility
 IEC 61545 Connecting devices – Devices for the connection of aluminium conductors in clamping units of any material and copper conductors in aluminium bodied clamping units
 IEC 61547 Equipment for general lighting purposes – EMC immunity requirements
 IEC 61549 Miscellaneous lamps
 IEC 61554 Panel-Mounted equipment – Electrical measuring instruments – Dimensions for panel mounting
 IEC 61557 Electrical safety in low voltage distribution systems up to 1 000 V a.c. and 1 500 V d.c. – Equipment for testing, measuring or monitoring of protective measures
 IEC 61558 Safety of power transformers, power supplies, reactors and similar products
 IEC 61559 Radiation protection instrumentation in nuclear facilities – Centralized systems for continuous monitoring of radiation and/or levels of radioactivity
 IEC 61560 Radiation protection instrumentation – Apparatus for non-destructive radiation tests of fur and other cloth samples
 IEC 61562 Radiation protection instrumentation – Portable equipment for measuring specific activity of beta-emitting radionuclides in foodstuffs
 IEC 61563 Radiation protection instrumentation – Equipment for measuring specific activity of gamma-emitting radionuclides in foodstuffs
 IEC 61566 Measurement of exposure to radio-frequency electromagnetic fields – Field strength in the frequency range 100 kHz to 1 GHz
 IEC 61577 Radiation protection instrumentation – Radon and radon decay product measuring instruments
 IEC 61578 Radiation protection instrumentation – Calibration and verification of the effectiveness of radon compensation for alpha and/or beta aerosol measuring instruments – Test methods
 IEC 61580 Measurement of return loss on waveguide and waveguide assemblies
 IEC 61582 Radiation protection instrumentation – In vivo counters – Classification, general requirements and test procedures for portable, transportable and installed equipment
 IEC 61584 Radiation protection instrumentation – Installed, portable or transportable assemblies – Measurement of air kerma direction and air kerma rate
 IEC TS 61586 Estimation of the reliability of electrical connectors
 IEC 61587 Mechanical structures for electronic equipment – Tests for IEC 60917 and IEC 60297 series
 IEC 61588 Precision clock synchronization protocol for networked measurement and control systems
 IEC 61591 Household range hoods – Methods for measuring performance
 IEC TR 61592 Household electrical appliances – Guidelines for consumer panel testing
 IEC 61595 Multichannel digital audio tape recorder (DATR), reel-to-reel system, for professional use
 IEC TR 61597 Overhead electrical conductors – Calculation methods for stranded bare conductors
 IEC 61599 Videodisk players – Methods of measurement
 IEC TR 61602 Connectors used in the field of audio, video and audiovisual engineering
 IEC 61603 Transmission of audio and/or video and related signals using infra-red radiation
 IEC TR 61604 Dimensions of uncoated ring cores of magnetic oxides (Withdrawn, replaced by IEC 62317-12:2016)
 IEC 61605 Fixed inductors for use in electronic and telecommunication equipment – Marking codes
 IEC 61606 Audio and audiovisual equipment – Digital audio parts – Basic measurement methods of audio characteristics
 IEC 61609 Microwave ferrite components – Guide for the drafting of specifications
 IEC 61610 Prints and transparencies produced from electronic sources – Assessment of image quality
 IEC 61619 Insulating liquids – Contamination by polychlorinated biphenyls (PCBs) – Method of determination by capillary column gas chromatography
 IEC 61620 Insulating liquids – Determination of the dielectric dissipation factor by measurement of the conductance and capacitance – Test method
 IEC 61621 Dry, solid insulating materials – Resistance test to high-voltage, low-current arc discharges
 IEC 61628 Corrugated pressboard and presspaper for electrical purposes
 IEC 61629 Aramid pressboard for electrical purposes
 IEC 61631 Test method for the mechanical strength of cores made of magnetic oxides
 IEC 61636 Software interface for Maintenance Information Collection and Analysis (SIMICA)
 IEC TR 61641 Enclosed low-voltage switchgear and controlgear assemblies – Guide for testing under conditions of arcing due to internal fault
 IEC 61642 Industrial a.c. networks affected by harmonics – Application of filters and shunt capacitors
 IEC 61643 Low-voltage surge protective devices
 IEC 61646 Thin-film terrestrial photovoltaic (PV) modules – Design qualification and type approval (Withdrawn, replaced by IEC 61215)
 IEC 61649 Weibull analysis
 IEC 61650 Reliability data analysis techniques – Procedures for comparison of two constant failure rates and two constant failure (event) intensities
 IEC 61660 Short-circuit currents in d.c. auxiliary installations in power plants and substations
 IEC 61666 Industrial systems, installations and equipment and industrial products – Identification of terminals within a system
 IEC 61669 Electroacoustics – Measurement of real-ear acoustical performance characteristics of hearing aids
 IEC 61671 Automatic Test Markup Language (ATML) for Exchanging Automatic Test Equipment and Test Information via XML
 IEC 61672 Electroacoustics – Sound level meters
 IEC 61674 Medical electrical equipment – Dosimeters with ionization chambers and/or semiconductor detectors as used in X-ray diagnostic imaging
 IEC 61675 Radionuclide imaging devices – Characteristics and test conditions
 IEC 61676 Medical electrical equipment – Dosimetric instruments used for non-invasive measurement of X-ray tube voltage in diagnostic radiology
 IEC 61683 Photovoltaic systems – Power conditioners – Procedure for measuring efficiency
 IEC 61685 Ultrasonics – Flow measurement systems – Flow test object
 IEC 61689 Ultrasonics – Physiotherapy systems – Field specifications and methods of measurement in the frequency range 0,5 MHz to 5 MHz
 IEC 61690 Electronic design interchange format (EDIF)
 IEC 61691 Behavioural languages
 IEC 61701 Salt mist corrosion testing of photovoltaic (PV) modules
 IEC 61703 Mathematical expressions for reliability, availability, maintainability and maintenance support terms
 IEC 61709 Electric components – Reliability – Reference conditions for failure rates and stress models for conversion
 IEC 61710 Power law model – Goodness-of-fit tests and estimation methods
 IEC 61724 Photovoltaic system performance
 IEC 61725 Analytical expression for daily solar profiles
 IEC 61726 Cable assemblies, cables, connectors and passive microwave components – Screening attenuation measurement by the reverberation chamber method
 IEC 61727 Photovoltaic (PV) systems – Characteristics of the utility interface
 IEC 61730 Photovoltaic (PV) module safety qualification
 IEC TR 61734 Application of symbols for binary logic and analogue elements
 IEC 61739 Integrated circuits
 IEC 61744 Calibration of fibre optic chromatic dispersion test sets
 IEC 61745 End-face image analysis procedure for the calibration of optical fibre geometry test sets
 IEC 61746 Calibration of optical time-domain reflectometers (OTDR)
 IEC 61747 Liquid crystal display devices
 IEC 61753 Fibre optic interconnecting devices and passive components – Performance standard
 IEC 61754 Fibre optic interconnecting devices and passive components – Fibre optic connector interfaces
 IEC 61755 Fibre optic interconnecting devices and passive components – Connector optical interfaces
 IEC 61756 Fibre optic interconnecting devices and passive components – Interface standard for fibre management systems
 IEC 61757 Fibre optic sensors
 IEC 61758 Fibre optic interconnecting devices and passive components – Interface standard for closures
 IEC 61760 Surface mounting technology
 IEC 61770 Electric appliances connected to the water mains – Avoidance of back-siphonage and failure of hose-sets
 IEC 61771 Nuclear power plants – Main control-room – Verification and validation of design
 IEC 61772 Nuclear power plants – Control rooms – Application of visual display units (VDUs)
 IEC 61773 Overhead lines – Testing of foundations for structures
 IEC TS 61774 Overhead lines – Meteorological data for assessing climatic loads
 IEC 61784 Industrial communication networks – Profiles
 IEC 61786 Measurement of DC magnetic, AC magnetic and AC electric fields from 1 Hz to 100 kHz with regard to exposure of human beings
 IEC 61788 Superconductivity
 IEC 61797 Transformers and inductors for use in telecommunication and electronic equipment – Main dimensions of coil formers
 IEC 61800 Adjustable speed electrical power drive systems
 IEC 61803 Determination of power losses in high-voltage direct current (HVDC) converter stations
 IEC TS 61804 Function blocks (FB) for process control
 IEC TR 61807 Magnetic properties of magnetically hard materials at elevated temperatures – Methods of measurement
 IEC 61810 Electromechanical elementary relays
 IEC 61811 Electromechanical telecom elementary relays of assessed quality
 IEC 61812 Time relays for industrial and residential use
 IEC TS 61813 Live working – Care, maintenance and in-service testing of aerial devices with insulating booms
 IEC 61817 Household portable appliances for cooking, grilling and similar use – Methods of measuring performance Household portable appliances for cooking, grilling and similar use – Methods for measuring performance
 IEC 61821 Electrical installations for lighting and beaconing of aerodromes – Maintenance of aeronautical ground lighting constant current series circuits
 IEC 61822 Electrical installations for lighting and beaconing of aerodromes – Constant current regulators
 IEC 61823 Electrical installations for lighting and beaconing of aerodromes – AGL series transformers
 IEC TS 61827 Electrical installations for lighting and beaconing of aerodromes – Characteristics of inset and elevated luminaires used on aerodromes and heliports
 IEC 61828 Ultrasonics – Focusing transducers – Definitions and measurement methods for the transmitted fields
 IEC 61829 Photovoltaic (PV) array – On-site measurement of current-voltage characteristics
 IEC TR 61831 On-line analyser systems – Guide to design and installation
 IEC TR 61832 Design and installation of on-line analyser systems – Guide to technical enquiry and bid evaluation
 IEC 61834 Recording – Helical-scan digital video cassette recording system using 6,35 mm magnetic tape for consumer use (525-60, 625–50, 1125–60 and 1250-50 systems)
 IEC 61835 Helical-scan digital component video cassette recording system using 12,65 mm (0,5 in) magnetic tape – Format D-5
 IEC TS 61836 Solar photovoltaic energy systems – Terms, definitions and symbols
 IEC 61837 Surface mounted piezoelectric devices for frequency control and selection – Standard outlines and terminal lead connections
 IEC TR 61838 Nuclear power plants – Instrumentation and control important to safety – Use of probabilistic safety assessment for the classification of functions
 IEC 61839 Nuclear power plants – Design of control rooms – Functional analysis and assignment
 IEC 61842 Microphones and earphones for speech communications
 IEC 61843 Measuring method for the level of intermodulation products generated in a gyromagnetic device
 IEC 61846 Ultrasonics – Pressure pulse lithotripters – Characteristics of fields
 IEC 61847 Ultrasonics – Surgical systems – Measurement and declaration of the basic output characteristics
 IEC 61850 Communication networks and systems for power utility automation
 IEC 61851 Electric vehicle conductive charging system
 IEC TR 61852 Medical electrical equipment – Digital imaging and communications in medicine (DICOM) – Radiotherapy objects
 IEC 61853 Photovoltaic (PV) module performance testing and energy rating
 IEC 61854 Overhead lines – Requirements and tests for spacers
 IEC 61855 Household electrical hair care appliances – Methods of measuring the performance
 IEC 61857 Electrical insulation systems
 IEC 61858 Electrical insulation systems – Thermal evaluation of modifications to an established electrical insulation system (EIS)
 IEC TR 61859 Guidelines for radiotherapy treatment rooms design
 IEC 61865 Overhead lines – Calculation of the electrical component of distance between live parts and obstacles – Method of calculation
 IEC 61866 Audiovisual systems – Interactive text transmission system (ITTS)
 IEC 61868 Mineral insulating oils – Determination of kinematic viscosity at very low temperatures
 IEC 61869 Instrument transformers
 IEC 61874 Nuclear instrumentation – Geophysical borehole instrumentation to determine rock density ('density logging')
 IEC 61880 Video systems (525/60) – Video and accompanied data using the vertical blanking interval – Analogue interface
 IEC 61881 Railway applications – Rolling stock equipment – Capacitors for power electronics
 IEC 61882 Hazard and operability studies (HAZOP studies) – Application guide
 IEC 61883 Consumer audio/video equipment – Digital interface
 IEC 61888 Nuclear power plants – Instrumentation important to safety – Determination and maintenance of trip setpoints
 IEC 61892 Mobile and fixed offshore units – Electrical installations
 IEC TS 61895 Ultrasonics – Pulsed Doppler diagnostic systems – Test procedures to determine performance
 IEC 61897 Overhead lines – Requirements and tests for Stockbridge type aeolian vibration dampers
 IEC TR 61901 Development tests recommended on cables with a longitudinally applied metal foil for rated voltages above 30 kV (Um = 36 kV)
 IEC 61904 Video recording – Helical-scan digital component video cassette recording format using 12,65 mm magnetic tape and incorporating data compression (Format digital-L)
 IEC 61907 Communication network dependability engineering
 IEC TR 61908 The technology roadmap for industry data dictionary structure, utilization and implementation
 IEC 61909 Audio recording – Minidisc system
 IEC 61910 Medical electrical equipment – Radiation dose documentation
 IEC TR 61911 Live working – Guidelines for installation of distribution line conductors – Stringing equipment and accessory items (Withdrawn, replaced by IEC TR 61328:2017)
 IEC TR 61912 Low-voltage switchgear and control gear – Overcurrent protective devices
 IEC 61914 Cable cleats for electrical installations
 IEC 61915 Low-voltage switchgear and control gear – Device profiles for networked industrial devices
 IEC TR 61916 Electrical accessories – Harmonization of general rules
 IEC 61918 Industrial communication networks – Installation of communication networks in industrial premises
 IEC 61920 Infrared free air applications
 IEC 61921 Power capacitors – Low-voltage power factor correction banks
 IEC 61922 High-frequency induction heating installations – Test methods for the determination of power output of the generator
 IEC TR 61923 Household electrical appliances – Method of measuring performance – Assessment of repeatability and reproducibility
 IEC 61924 Maritime navigation and radiocommunication equipment and systems – Integrated navigation systems
 IEC 61925 Multimedia systems and equipment – Multimedia home server systems – Vocabulary of home server
 IEC 61926 Design automation
 IEC TR 61930 Fibre optic graphical symbology
 IEC TR 61931 Fibre optic – Terminology
 IEC TS 61934 Electrical insulating materials and systems – Electrical measurement of partial discharges (PD) under short rise time and repetitive voltage impulses
 IEC 61935 Specification for the testing of balanced and coaxial information technology cabling
 IEC 61936 Power installations exceeding 1 kV a.c.
 IEC 61937 Digital audio – Interface for non-linear PCM encoded audio bitstreams applying IEC 60958
 IEC 61938 Multimedia systems – Guide to the recommended characteristics of analogue interfaces to achieve interoperability
 IEC 61943 Integrated circuits – Manufacturing line approval application guideline
 IEC TS 61944 Integrated circuits – Manufacturing line approval – Demonstration vehicles
 IEC TS 61945 Integrated circuits – Manufacturing line approval – Methodology for technology and failure analysis
 IEC TR 61946 Mineral insulating oils – Characterization of paraffinic/naphthenic nature – Low temperature differential scanning calorimetry (DSC) test method
 IEC 61947 Electronic projection – Measurement and documentation of key performance criteria
 IEC TR 61948 Nuclear medicine instrumentation – Routine tests
 IEC TS 61949 Ultrasonics – Field characterization – In situ exposure estimation in finite-amplitude ultrasonic beams
 IEC 61950 Cable management systems – Specifications for conduit fittings and accessories for cable installations for extra heavy duty electrical steel conduit
 IEC 61951 Secondary cells and batteries containing alkaline or other non-acid electrolytes – Portable sealed rechargeable single cells
 IEC 61952 Insulators for overhead lines – Composite line post insulators for A.C. systems with a nominal voltage greater than 1 000 V – Definitions, test methods and acceptance criteria
 IEC 61954 Static var compensators (SVC) – Testing of thyristor valves
 IEC TS 61956 Methods of test for the evaluation of water treeing in insulating materials
 IEC 61959 Secondary cells and batteries containing alkaline or other non-acid electrolytes – Mechanical tests for sealed portable secondary cells and batteries
 IEC 61960 Secondary cells and batteries containing alkaline or other non-acid electrolytes – Secondary lithium cells and batteries for portable applications
 IEC 61964 Integrated circuits – Memory devices pin configurations
 IEC 61965 Mechanical safety of cathode ray tubes
 IEC 61966 Multimedia systems and equipment – Colour measurement and management
 IEC 61967 Integrated circuits – Measurement of electromagnetic emissions, 150 kHz to 1 GHz
 IEC 61968 Application integration at electric utilities – System interfaces for distribution management
 IEC 61969 Mechanical structures for electronic equipment – Outdoor enclosures
 IEC 61970 Energy management system application program interface (EMS-API)
 IEC TS 61973 High voltage direct current (HVDC) substation audible noise
 IEC 61975 High-voltage direct current (HVDC) installations – System tests
 IEC 61976 Nuclear instrumentation – Spectrometry – Characterization of the spectrum background in HPGe gamma-ray spectrometry
 IEC 61977 Fibre optic interconnecting devices and passive components – Fibre optic filters – Generic specification
 IEC 61978 Fibre optic interconnecting devices and passive components – Fibre optic passive chromatic dispersion compensators
 IEC 61980 Electric vehicle wireless power transfer (WPT) systems
 IEC 61982 Secondary batteries (except lithium) for the propulsion of electric road vehicles – Performance and endurance tests
 IEC 61984 Connectors – Safety requirements and tests
 IEC 61987 Industrial-process measurement and control – Data structures and elements in process equipment catalogues
 IEC 61988 Plasma display panels
 IEC 61991 Railway applications – Rolling stock – Protective provisions against electrical hazards
 IEC 61992 Railway applications – Fixed installations – DC switchgear
 IEC 61993 Maritime navigation and radiocommunication equipment and systems
 IEC TS 61994 Piezoelectric, dielectric and electrostatic devices and associated materials for frequency control, selection and detection – Glossary
 IEC 61995 Devices for the connection of luminaires for household and similar purposes
 IEC 61996 Maritime navigation and radiocommunication equipment and systems – Shipborne voyage data recorder (VDR)
 IEC TR 61997 Guidelines for the user interface in multimedia equipment for general purpose use
 IEC TR 61998 Model and framework for standardization in multimedia equipment and systems
 IEC TR 62000 Guidance for combining different single-mode fibres types
 IEC TR 62001 High-voltage direct current (HVDC) systems – Guidance to the specification and design evaluation of AC
 IEC 62002 Mobile and portable DVB-T/H radio access
 IEC 62003 Nuclear power plants – Instrumentation and control important to safety – Requirements for electromagnetic compatibility testing
 IEC 62004 Thermal-resistant aluminium alloy wire for overhead line conductor
 IEC 62005 Reliability of fibre optic interconnecting devices and passive components
 IEC 62006 Hydraulic machines – Acceptance tests of small hydroelectric installations
 IEC 62007 Semiconductor optoelectronic devices for fibre optic system applications
 IEC 62008 Performance characteristics and calibration methods for digital data acquisition systems and relevant software
 IEC TR 62010 Analyser systems – Guidance for maintenance management
 IEC 62011 Insulating materials – Industrial, rigid, moulded, laminated tubes and rods of rectangular and hexagonal cross-section based on thermosetting resins for electrical purposes
 IEC 62012 Multicore and symmetrical pair/quad cables for digital communications to be used in harsh environments
 IEC 62014 Electronic design automation libraries
 IEC 62014-4 IP-XACT – Standard Structure for Packaging, Integrating, and Reusing IP within Tool Flows
 IEC 62014-5 Quality of Electronic and Software Intellectual Property Used in System and System on Chip (SoC) Designs
 IEC 62018 Power consumption of information technology equipment – Measurement methods
 IEC 62019 Electrical accessories – Circuit-breakers and similar equipment for household use – Auxiliary contact units
 IEC 62020 Electrical accessories – Residual current monitors for household and similar uses (RCMs)
 IEC 62021 Insulating liquids – Determination of acidity
 IEC 62022 Installed monitors for the control and detection of gamma radiations contained in recyclable or non-recyclable materials transported by vehicles
 IEC 62023 Structuring of technical information and documentation
 IEC 62024 High frequency inductive components – Electrical characteristics and measuring methods
 IEC 62025 High frequency inductive components – Non-electrical characteristics and measuring methods
 IEC 62026 Low-voltage switchgear and control gear – Controller-device interfaces (CDIs)
 IEC 62027 Preparation of object lists, including parts lists
 IEC 62028 General methods of measurement for digital television receivers
 IEC 62031 LED modules for general lighting – Safety specifications
 IEC 62032 Guide for the Application, Specification and Testing of Phase-Shifting Transformers
 IEC 62033 Attenuation uniformity in optical fibres
 IEC 62034 Automatic test systems for battery powered emergency escape lighting
 IEC 62035 Discharge lamps (excluding fluorescent lamps) – Safety specifications
 IEC 62036 Mineral insulating oils – Oxidation stability test method based on differential scanning calorimetry (DSC)
 IEC 62037 Passive RF and microwave devices, intermodulation level measurement
 IEC TR 62039 Selection guide for polymeric materials for outdoor use under HV stress
 IEC 62040 Uninterruptible power systems (UPS)
 IEC 62041 Transformers, power supplies, reactors and similar products – EMC requirements
 IEC 62044 Cores made of soft magnetic materials – Measuring methods
 IEC TS 62045 Multimedia security – Guideline for privacy protection of equipment and systems in and out of use
 IEC TS 62046 Safety of machinery – Application of protective equipment to detect the presence of persons
 IEC 62047 Semiconductor devices – Micro-electromechanical devices
 IEC TR 62048 Optical fibres – Reliability – Power law theory
 IEC TR 62051 Electricity metering – Data exchange for meter reading, tariff and load control – Glossary of terms
 IEC 62052 Electricity metering equipment (a.c.) – General requirements, tests and test conditions
 IEC 62053 Electricity metering equipment (a.c.) – Particular requirements
 IEC 62054 Electricity metering (a.c.) – Tariff and load control
 IEC 62055 Electricity metering – Payment systems
 IEC 62056 Electricity metering data exchange – The DLMS/COSEM suite
 IEC 62058 Electricity metering equipment (AC) – Acceptance inspection
 IEC 62059 Electricity metering equipment – Dependability
 IEC 62060 Secondary cells and batteries – Monitoring of lead acid stationary batteries – User guide
 IEC 62061 Safety of machinery: Functional safety of electrical, electronic and programmable electronic control systems
 IEC TR 62063 High-voltage switchgear and control gear – The use of electronic and associated technologies in auxiliary equipment of switchgear and control gear
 IEC 62065 Maritime navigation and radiocommunication equipment and systems – Track control systems – Operational and performance requirements, methods of testing and required test results
 IEC TR 62066 Surge overvoltages and surge protection in low-voltage a.c. power systems – General basic information
 IEC 62067 Power cables with extruded insulation and their accessories for rated voltages above 150 kV (Um = 170 kV) up to 500 kV (Um = 550 kV) – Test methods and requirements
 IEC 62068 Electrical insulating materials and systems – General method of evaluation of electrical endurance under repetitive voltage impulses
 IEC 62070 Broadcast digital video tape recorders – Identification method for recording and/or reproduction error status
 IEC 62071 Helical-scan compressed digital video cassette system using 6,35 mm magnetic tape – Format D-7
 IEC TS 62073 Guidance on the measurement of hydrophobicity of insulator surfaces
 IEC 62074 Fibre optic interconnecting devices and passive components – Fibre optic WDM devices
 IEC 62075 Audio/video, information and communication technology equipment – Environmentally conscious design
 IEC 62076 Industrial electroheating installations – Test methods for induction channel and induction crucible furnaces
 IEC 62077 Fibre optic interconnecting devices and passive components – Fibre optic circulators – Generic specification
 IEC 62080 Sound signalling devices for household and similar purposes
 IEC 62083 Medical electrical equipment – Requirements for the safety of radiotherapy treatment planning systems
 IEC 62087 Audio, video, and related equipment – Determination of power consumption
 IEC 62088 Nuclear instrumentation – Photodiodes for scintillation detectors – Test procedures
 IEC 62089 Nuclear instrumentation – Calibration and usage of alpha/beta gas proportional counters
 IEC 62090 Product package labels for electronic components using bar code and two-dimensional symbologies
 IEC 62091 Low-voltage switchgear and control gear – Controllers for drivers of stationary fire pumps
 IEC 62093 Balance-of-system components for photovoltaic systems – Design qualification natural environments
 IEC 62094 Indicator light units for household and similar fixed-electrical installations
 IEC TR 62095 Electric cables – Calculations for current ratings – Finite element method
 IEC TR 62096 Nuclear power plants – Instrumentation and control important to safety – Guidance for the decision on modernization
 IEC 62097 Hydraulic machines, radial and axial – Performance conversion method from model to prototype
 IEC TS 62098 Evaluation methods for microprocessor- based instruments
 IEC 62099 Fibre optic wavelength switches – Generic specification
 IEC TS 62100 Cables for aeronautical ground lighting primary circuits
 IEC TS 62101 Electrical insulation systems – Short-time evaluation of combined thermal and electrical stresses
 IEC TS 62102 Electrical safety – Classification of interfaces for equipment to be connected to information and communications technology networks
 IEC 62104 Characteristics of DAB receivers
 IEC 62105 Digital audio broadcast system – Specification of the receiver data interface (RDI)
 IEC 62106 Specification of the radio data system (RDS) for VHF/FM sound broadcasting in the frequency range from 87,5 MHz to 108,0 MHz
 IEC 62107 Super video compact disc – Disc-interchange system-specification
 IEC 62108 Concentrator photovoltaic (CPV) modules and assemblies – Design qualification and type approval
 IEC 62109 Safety of power converters for use in photovoltaic power systems
 IEC 62110 Electric and magnetic field levels generated by AC power systems – Measurement procedures with regard to public exposure
 IEC 62115 Electric toys – Safety
 IEC 62116 Utility-interconnected photovoltaic inverters – Test procedure of islanding prevention measures
 IEC 62117 Nuclear reactor instrumentation – Pressurized light water reactors (PWR) – Monitoring adequate cooling within the core during cold shutdown
 IEC 62121 Methods of measurement for minidisc recorders/players
 IEC 62122 Methods of measurement for consumer-use digital VTRs – Electronic and mechanical performances
 IEC 62124 Photovoltaic (PV) stand alone systems – Design verification
 IEC TR 62125 Environmental statement specific to IEC TC 20 – Electric cables
 IEC 62127 Ultrasonics – Hydrophones
 IEC 62128 Railway applications – Fixed installations – Electrical safety, earthing and the return circuit
 IEC 62129 Calibration of wavelength/optical frequency measurement instruments
 IEC TR 62130 Climatic field data including validation
 IEC TR 62131 Environmental conditions – Vibration and shock of electrotechnical equipment
 IEC 62132 Integrated circuits – Measurement of electromagnetic immunity
 IEC 62133 Secondary cells and batteries containing alkaline or other non-acid electrolytes – Safety requirements for portable sealed secondary cells, and for batteries made from them, for use in portable applications
 IEC 62134 Fibre optic interconnecting devices and passive components – Fibre optic closures
 IEC 62135 Resistance welding equipment
 IEC 62137 Surface mounting technology – Environmental and endurance test methods for surface mount solder joint
 IEC 62138 Nuclear power plants – Instrumentation and control important for safety – Software aspects for computer-based systems performing category B or C functions
 IEC 62141 Helical-scan digital video cassette recording format using 12,65 mm magnetic tape and incorporating MPEG-4 compression – Type D-16 format
 IEC TS 62143 Electrical installations for lighting and beaconing of aerodromes – Aeronautical ground lighting systems – Guidelines for the development of a safety lifecycle methodology
 IEC 62146 Grading capacitors for high-voltage alternating current circuit-breakers
 IEC 62148 Fibre optic active components and devices – Package and interface standards
 IEC 62149 Fibre optic active components and devices – Performance standards
 IEC 62150 Fibre optic active components and devices – Test and measurement procedures
 IEC 62151 Safety of equipment electrically connected to a telecommunication network
 IEC TR 62152 Transmission properties of cascaded two-ports or quadripols – Background of terms and definitions
 IEC 62153 Metallic communication cables test methods
 IEC 62155 Hollow pressurized and unpressurized ceramic and glass insulators for use in electrical equipment with rated voltages greater than 1 000 V
 IEC 62156 Digital video recording with video compression 12,65 mm type D-9 component format 525/60 and 625/50 (Digital S)
 IEC TR 62157 Cylindrical machined carbon electrodes – Nominal dimensions
 IEC PAS 62162 Field-induced charged-device model test method for electrostatic discharge withstand thresholds of microelectronic components
 IEC TR 62188 Secondary cells and batteries containing alkaline or other non-acid electrolytes – Design and manufacturing recommendations for portable batteries made from sealed secondary cells
 IEC 62192 Live working – Insulating ropes
 IEC 62193 Live working – Telescopic sticks and telescopic measuring sticks
 IEC 62194 Method of evaluating the thermal performance of enclosures
 IEC 62196 Plugs, socket-outlets, vehicle connectors and vehicle inlets – Conductive charging of electric vehicles
 IEC 62197 Connectors for electronic equipment – Quality assessment requirements
 IEC 62198 Managing risk in projects – Application guidelines
 IEC 62208 Empty enclosures for low-voltage switchgear and control gear assemblies – General requirements
 IEC 62209 Human exposure to radio frequency fields from hand-held and body-mounted wireless communication devices – Human models, instrumentation, and procedures
 IEC 62211 Inductive components – Reliability management
 IEC 62215 Integrated circuits – Measurement of impulse immunity
 IEC 62216 Digital terrestrial television receivers for the DVB-T system
 IEC 62217 Polymeric HV insulators for indoor and outdoor use – General definitions, test methods and acceptance criteria
 IEC 62219 Overhead electrical conductors – Formed wire, concentric lay, stranded conductors
 IEC 62220 Medical electrical equipment – Characteristics of digital X-ray imaging devices
 IEC TR 62221 Optical fibres – Measurement methods – Microbending sensitivity
 IEC TR 62222 Fire performance of communication cables installed in buildings
 IEC 62223 Insulators – Glossary of terms and definitions
 IEC TS 62224 Multimedia home server systems – Conceptual model for digital rights management
 IEC 62226 Exposure to electric or magnetic fields in the low and intermediate frequency range – Methods for calculating the current density and internal electric field induced in the human body
 IEC 62227 Multimedia home server systems – Digital rights permission code
 IEC 62228 Integrated circuits – EMC evaluation of transceivers
 IEC TS 62229 Multimedia systems and equipment – Multimedia e-publishing and e-book – Conceptual model for multimedia e-publishing
 IEC 62230 Electric cables – Spark-test method
 IEC 62231 Composite station post insulators for substations with AC voltages greater than 1 000 V up to 245 kV
 IEC 62232 Determination of RF field strength, power density and SAR in the vicinity of radiocommunication base stations for the purpose of evaluating human exposure
 IEC 62233 Measurement methods for electromagnetic fields of household appliances and similar apparatus with regard to human exposure
 IEC TR 62235 Nuclear facilities – Instrumentation and control systems important to safety – Systems of interim storage and final repository of nuclear fuel and waste
 IEC 62236 Railway applications – Electromagnetic compatibility
 IEC 62237 Live working – Insulating hoses with fittings for use with hydraulic tools and equipment
 IEC 62238 Maritime navigation and radiocommunication equipment and systems – VHF radiotelephone equipment incorporating Class "D" Digital Selective Calling (DSC) – Methods of testing and required test results
 IEC TS 62239 Process management for avionics – Management plan
 IEC TR 62240 Process management for avionics – Electronic components capability in operation
 IEC 62241 Nuclear power plants – Main control room – Alarm functions and presentation
 IEC 62243 Artificial Intelligence Exchange and Service Tie to All Test Environments (AI-ESTATE)
 IEC 62244 Radiation protection instrumentation – Installed radiation monitors for the detection of radioactive and special nuclear materials at national borders
 IEC 62246 Reed switches
 IEC TR 62251 Multimedia systems and equipment – Quality assessment – Audio-video communication systems
 IEC 62253 Photovoltaic pumping systems – Design qualification and performance measurements
 IEC 62255 Multicore and symmetrical pair/quad cables for broadband digital communications (high bit rate digital access telecommunication networks) – Outside plant cables
 IEC 62256 Hydraulic turbines, storage pumps and pump-turbines – Rehabilitation and performance improvement
 IEC TS 62257 Recommendations for renewable energy and hybrid systems for rural electrification
 IEC 62258 Semiconductor die products
 IEC 62259 Secondary cells and batteries containing alkaline or other non-acid electrolytes – Nickel-cadmium prismatic secondary single cells with partial gas recombination
 IEC 62262 Degrees of protection provided by enclosures for electrical equipment against external mechanical impacts (IK code)
 IEC TR 62263 Live working – Guidelines for the installation and maintenance of optical fibre cables on overhead power lines
 IEC 62264 Enterprise-control system integration
 IEC 62265 Advanced Library Format (ALF) describing Integrated Circuit (IC) technology, cells and blocks (Withdrawn)
 IEC 62267 Railway applications – Automated urban guided transport (AUGT) – Safety requirements
 IEC 62270 Guide for computer-based control for hydroelectric power plant automation
 IEC 62271 High-voltage switchgear and control gear
 IEC 62272 Digital radio mondiale (DRM)
 IEC 62273 Methods of measurement for radio transmitters
 IEC 62274 Medical electrical equipment – Safety of radiotherapy record and verify systems
 IEC 62275 Cable management systems – Cable ties for electrical installations
 IEC 62276 Single crystal wafers for surface acoustic wave (SAW) device applications – Specifications and measuring methods
 IEC 62278 Railway applications – Specification and demonstration of reliability, availability, maintainability and safety (RAMS)
 IEC 62279 Railway applications – Communication, signalling and processing systems – Software for railway control and protection systems
 IEC 62280 Railway applications – Communication, signalling and processing systems – Safety related communication in transmission systems
 IEC 62281 Safety of primary and secondary lithium cells and batteries during transport
 IEC 62282 Fuel cell technologies
 IEC TR 62283 Optical fibres – Guidance for nuclear radiation tests
 IEC TR 62284 Effective area measurements of single-mode optical fibres – Guidance
 IEC TR 62285 Application guide for non-linear coefficient measuring methods
 IEC 62286 Service diagnostic interface for consumer electronics products and networks – Implementation for IEEE 1394
 IEC 62287 Maritime navigation and radiocommunication equipment and systems – Class B shipborne equipment of the automatic identification system (AIS)
 IEC 62288 Maritime navigation and radiocommunication equipment and systems – Presentation of navigation-related information on shipborne navigational displays – General requirements, methods of testing and required test results
 IEC 62289 Video recording – Helical-scan digital video cassette recording format using 12,65 mm magnetic tape and incorporating MPEG-2 Compression – Format D-10
 IEC 62290 Railway applications – Urban guided transport management and command/control systems
 IEC TR 62291 Multimedia data storage – Application program interface for UDF based file systems
 IEC 62295 Multimedia systems – Common communication protocol for inter-connectivity on heterogeneous networks
 IEC TR 62296 Considerations of unaddressed safety aspects in the second edition of IEC 60601-1 and proposals for new requirements 
 IEC 62297 Triggering messages for broadcast applications
 IEC 62298 Teleweb application
 IEC 62300 Consumer audio/video equipment digital interface with plastic optical fibre
 IEC 62301 Household electrical appliances – Measurement of standby power
 IEC 62304 Medical Device Software – Software Life Cycle Processes
 IEC 62305 Protection Against Lightning
 IEC 62310 Static Transfer Systems (STS)
 IEC 62325 Standards related to energy market models & communications
 IEC TR 62331 Pulsed field magnetometry
 IEC 62351 Power System Control and Associated Communications – Data and Communication Security
 IEC 62353 Medical electrical equipment – Recurrent test and test after repair of medical electrical equipment
 IEC/TR 62357 Power system control and associated communications – Reference architecture for object models, services and protocols
 IEC 62365 Digital audio – Digital input-output interfacing – Transmission of digital audio over asynchronous transfer mode (ATM) networks
 IEC 62366 Medical devices – Application of usability engineering to medical devices
 IEC 62368 Audio/video, information and communication technology equipment 
 IEC 62379 Common control interface for networked digital audio and video products
 IEC 62384 DC or AC supplied electronic control gear for LED modules – Performance requirements
 IEC 62386 Digital addressable lighting interface
 IEC 62388 Maritime Navigation and Radio Communications, Shipborne Radar
 IEC 62395 Electrical resistance trace heating systems for industrial and commercial applications
 IEC 62420 Concentric lay stranded overhead electrical conductors containing one or more gap(s)
 IEC 62425 Railway applications - Communication, signalling and processing systems - Safety related electronic systems for signalling
 IEC 62439 Industrial communication networks – High availability automation networks
 IEC 62443 Industrial communication networks – Network and system security
 IEC 62446 Grid connected photovoltaic systems – Minimum requirements for system documentation, commissioning tests and inspection 
 IEC 62455 Internet protocol (IP) and transport stream (TS) based service access
 IEC 62464 Magnetic resonance equipment for medical imaging
 IEC 62471 Photobiological safety of lamps and lamp systems
 IEC 62474 Material declaration for products of and for the electrotechnical industry 
 IEC 62481 Digital Living Network Alliance (DLNA) home networked device interoperability guidelines
 IEC 62491 Industrial systems, installations and equipment and industrial products – Labelling of cables and cores
 IEC 62493 Assessment of lighting equipment related to human exposure to electromagnetic fields
 IEC 62502 Analysis techniques for dependability – Event tree analysis (ETA)
 IEC 62504 General lighting – Light emitting diode (LED) products and related equipment – Terms and definitions
 IEC 62505 Railway applications – Fixed installations – Particular requirements for a.c. switchgear 
 IEC 62507 Identification systems enabling unambiguous information interchange – Requirements 
 IEC 62531 Property Specification Language (PSL)
 IEC TS 62556 Ultrasonics – Field characterization – Specification and measurement of field parameters for high intensity therapeutic ultrasound (HITU) transducers and systems
 IEC 62560 Self-ballasted LED-lamps for general lighting services by voltage > 50 V – Safety specifications
 IEC 62561 Lightning protection system components (LPSC)
 IEC 62605 Multimedia systems and equipment – Multimedia e-publishing and e-books – Interchange format for e-dictionaries
 IEC 62606 General requirements for arc fault detection devices
 IEC 62612 Self-ballasted LED lamps for general lighting services with supply voltages > 50 V – Performance requirements 
 IEC 62680 Universal Serial Bus (USB) interfaces for data and power
 IEC 62682 Management of alarm systems for the process industries
 IEC 62684 Interoperability specifications of common external power supply (EPS) for use with data-enabled mobile telephones
 IEC/TR 62685 Industrial communication networks – Profiles – Assessment guideline for safety devices using IEC 61784-3 functional safety communication profiles (FSCPs)
 IEC 62693 Industrial electroheating installations – Test methods for infrared electroheating installations
 IEC 62700 DC Power supply for notebook computer
 IEC 62703 Expression of performance of fluorometric oxygen analyzers in liquid media
 IEC 62708 Documents kinds for electrical and instrumentation projects in the process industry
 IEC 62717 LED modules for general lighting – Performance requirements
 IEC 62734 Industrial networks – Wireless communication network and communication profiles – ISA 100.11a
 IEC 62752 In-cable control and protection device for mode 2 charging of electric roadvehicles
 IEC 62769 Field device integration (FDI)
 IEC 62776 Double-capped LED lamps designed to retrofit linear fluorescent lamps – Safety specifications
 IEC/TR 62794 Industrial-process measurement, control and automation – Reference model for representation of production facilities (digital factory)
 IEC/TR 62795 Interoperation guide of field device tool (FDT) / device type manager (DTM) and electronic device description language (EDDL)
 IEC/TS 62796 Energy efficiency in electroheating installations
 IEC 62798 Industrial electroheating equipment – Test methods for infrared emitters
 IEC/TR 62837 Energy efficiency through automation systems
 IEC 62840 Electric vehicle battery swap system
IEC 62881 Cause and Effect Matrix
 IEC 62885 Dry vacuum cleaners for household or similar use – Methods for measuring the performance
 IEC/TS 62872 Industrial-process measurement, control and automation system interface between industrial facilities and the smart grid
 IEC/TR 62914 Secondary cells and batteries containing alkaline or other non-acid electrolytes – Experimental procedure for the forced internal short-circuit test of IEC 62133:2012
 IEC/PAS 62948 Industrial networks – Wireless communication network and communication profiles – WIA-FA
 IEC/PAS 62953 Industrial communication networks – Fieldbus specifications – ADS-net
 IEC 63110 Protocol for the management of electric vehicles charging and discharging infrastructures
 IEC 63119 Protocol for information exchange for electric vehicle charging roaming services
 IEC 63382 Protocol for the management of distributed energy storage systems based on electric vehicles
 IEC/TS 63383 Cybersecurity aspects of devices used for power metering and monitoring, power quality monitoring, data collection and analysis
 IEC/TS 63384 Power System Stability Control
 IEC/TR 63385 Transmitting and receiving equipment for radiocommunication
 IEC/PAS 63386 CONDUCTIVE CHARGING OF ELECTRIC VEHICLE
 IEC 63387 Hybrid CPV/PV modules
 IEC/TS 63389 Developing a profile composed of a set of Basic Application Profiles (BAPs) of IEC 61850 for DER compliant to IEEE 1547
 IEC/TS 63390 Technical Specifications for Digitalization of Operation and Maintenance in Hydropower Assets
 IEC 63391 General technical requirements for millimeter wave holographic imaging body scanner
 IEC/TS 63392 Fire test for concentrator PV modules
 IEC/TR 63393 Electrical systems for electric road vehicles and electric industrial trucks
 IEC/TS 63394 Safety of machinery – Guidelines on functional safety of safety-related control system
 IEC 63395 Sustainable management of waste electrical and electronic equipment (e-waste).
 IEC/TS 63397 Guidelines for qualifying PV modules for increased hail resistance
 IEC/TS 63398 Technical Specification for Black Start of Hydropower Plant
 IEC 63399 Household and similar use electrical rice cookers - Methods for measuring the performance
 IEC/TR 63401 Dynamic characteristics of inverter-based resources in bulk power systems
 IEC 63402 Energy Efficiency Systems - Smart Grid - Customer Energy Management Systems - General Requirements and Architecture
 IEC 63403 LED packages for horticultural lighting
 IEC 63404 Switchgear and controlgear and their assemblies for low voltage – Integration method of radiocommunication device into an equipment
 IEC 63405 High-voltage test techniques - Dielectric loss measurements "PROPOSED HORIZONTAL STANDARD"
 IEC/TS 63406 Generic RMS simulation models of converter-based generating units for power system dynamic analysis
 IEC 63407 Conductive charging of electric vehicles - Contact interface for automated connection device (ACD)
 IEC/SRD 63408 Safety Aspects – Guideline for Adult AAL Care Recipients in standards and other specifications
 IEC 63409 Photovoltaic power generating systems connection with grid
 IEC/TR 63410 Decentralized electrical energy systems roadmap
 IEC/TR 63411 Grid Connection of Offshore Wind via VSC-HVDC System
 IEC 63412 Ultrasonics - Shear-wave elastography
 IEC 63413 Nuclear Power Plants - Instrumentation and control systems important to safety - Platform qualification
 IEC/TS 63414 Artificial pollution tests on high-voltage insulators made of hydrophobicity transfer materials to be used on a.c. and d.c. systems
 IEC/TR 63415 Nuclear Power plants – Instrumentation and control systems – Use of formal security models for I&C security architecture design and assessment
 IEC/SRD 63416 Ethical considerations of AI when Applied in the Active Assisted Living (AAL) context
 IEC/TS 63417 Guide and plan to develop a unified IEC Smart energy Ontology
 IEC 63418 Fixed accessories intended for household and similar purposes that supply power through an interface
 IEC 63419 Guideline for Switching Reliability Evaluation procedures for Gallium Nitride Power Conversion Devices
 IEC/SRD 63420 Cooperative Multiple Systems in Connected Home Environments – AAL SOTIF of E/E Systems
 IEC 63423 Nuclear Power Plants - Instrumentation and control systems important to safety - Cable assemblies for Harsh Environment Purposes
 IEC/TR 63424 Validation of dynamic power control and exposure time-averaging algorithms
 IEC/TR 63425 Connectivity for Lighting Systems
 IEC 80000 Quantities and units 
 IEC 80001 Application of risk management for IT-networks incorporating medical devices
 IEC/TR 80002 Medical device software
 IEC/TS 80004 Nanotechnologies
 IEC/IEEE 80005 Utility connections in port
 IEC 80369 Small-bore connectors for liquids and gases in healthcare applications
 IEC 80416 Basic principles for graphical symbols for use on equipment
 IEC 80601 Medical electrical equipment
 IEC 81346 Industrial systems, installations and equipment and industrial products – Structuring principles and reference designations
 IEC 81714 Design of graphical symbols for use in the technical documentation of products
 IEC 82045 Document management
 IEC 82079 Preparation of instructions for use – Structuring, content and presentation
 IEC 82304 Health software 
 IEC 88528 Reciprocating internal combustion engine driven alternating current generating sets

See also 
 :Category:IEC standards
 List of IEC technical committees
 List of ISO standards – covers also standards jointly published by the International Organization for Standardization and the IEC

References

External links 
 Search IEC catalogue

IEC
Electrical standards
Standards
Lists of standards